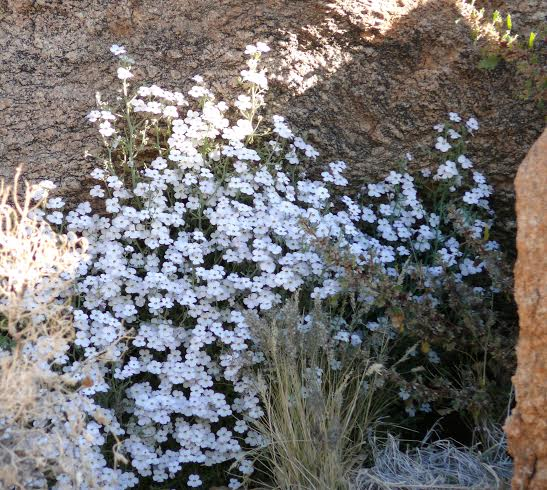

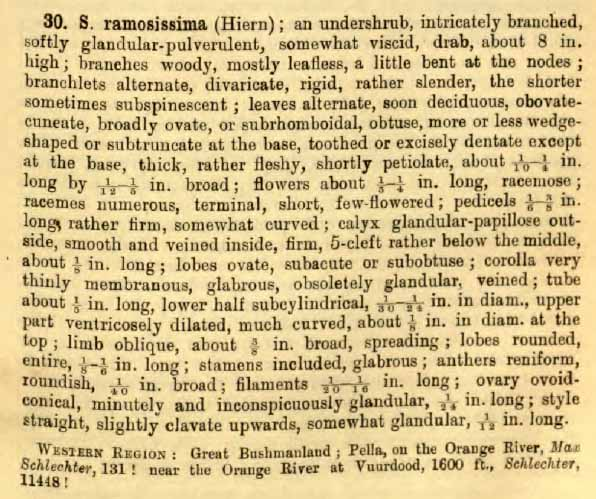
- Hiern's original description of the species

Scientific classification
- Kingdom: Plantae
- Clade: Embryophytes
- Clade: Tracheophytes
- Clade: Angiosperms
- Clade: Eudicots
- Clade: Asterids
- Order: Lamiales
- Family: Scrophulariaceae
- Genus: Jamesbrittenia
- Species: J. ramosissima

Binomial name
- Jamesbrittenia ramosissima (Hiern) Hilliard

Synonyms
- Sutera ramosissima Hiern

= Jamesbrittenia ramosissima =

Species of shrub

Jamesbrittenia ramosissima is a Southern African shrub in the family Scrophulariaceae occurring in the Northern Cape and southern Namibia, westward along the Gariep River from the vicinity of Augrabies Falls. It is one of some 90 species in the genus Jamesbrittenia, ranging through Africa, with 74 species occurring in Southern Africa, and 1 in India. The genus is named for James Britten (1846-1924), medical student turned botanist, and acting Keeper of Botany at the British Museum when Kuntze named it.

This extremely twiggy shrub ('ramosissima'), which grows to about 1m in height, bears a profusion of white or bluish-mauve flowers and is found growing under semi-desert conditions in cracks in sheetrock and on steep, bare, rocky slopes in very dry and hot locations bordering the Gariep River, from near the Augrabies Falls, through the Richtersveld to the vicinity of the river mouth. The branches of this shrub are woody and rigid, divaricate, and sometimes spinescent. The thick and rather fleshy leaves are alternate, shortly petiolate, obovate-cuneate to broadly ovate in shape, with a wedge-shaped base, margin toothed except at the base, about 2-6mm long by 2-6mm broad.

Carl Ernst Otto Kuntze (1843–1907) in 1891 first published a description of the genus in "Revisio Generum Plantarum" 2: 461, based on the earlier description of Sutera by Albrecht Wilhelm Roth (1757–1834) in 1821.

"Shrubs, suffrutices, perennial or annual herbs, glandular and often aromatic. Leaves opposite, often alternate above, sometimes ± fasciculate, simple or deeply divided. Inflorescence racemose with flowers solitary in axils. Calyx 5-lobed, divided almost to base. Corolla tube always cylindric below, abruptly expanded near apex; in throat a broad transverse band of clavate hairs; lobes spreading. Stamens 4, didynamous; anthers usually included; posticous filaments decurrent down corolla tube, often to base, pubescent. Stigma exserted, usually tongue-shaped, with 2 marginal bands of papillae. Fruit a septicidal capsule. Seeds with reticulate testa."

— "Flora of Zimbabwe"

The species was first described in 1904 as Sutera ramosissima by the botanist and mathematician William Philip Hiern in Harvey's Fl. Cap. 4: II. 265. (see illustration) Hiern's description was based on two specimens collected by Max Schlechter (1874-1960), and his more famous brother, Rudolf Schlechter (1872-1925).

== Gallery ==
Specimen from Farm Naukluft near Rosh Pinah

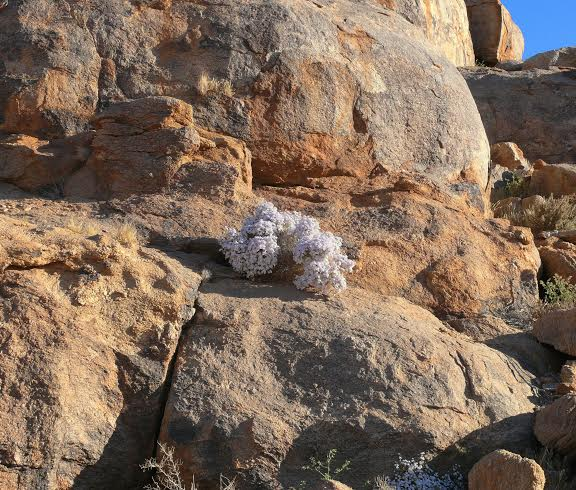
Near Augrabies

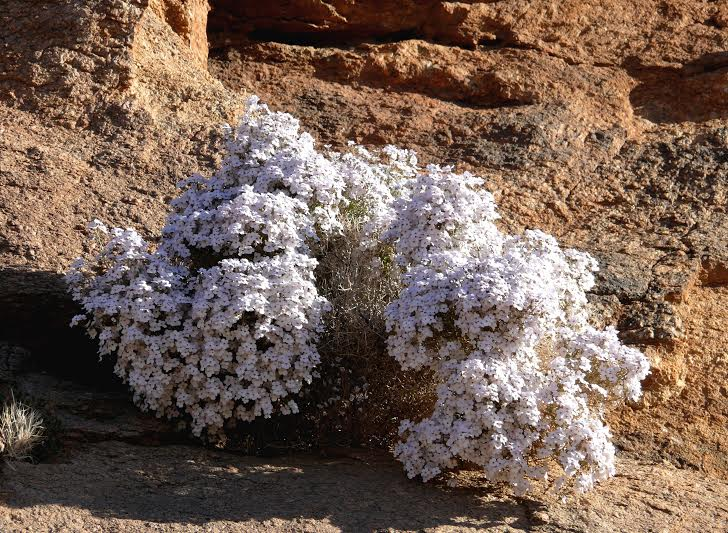
Near Augrabies

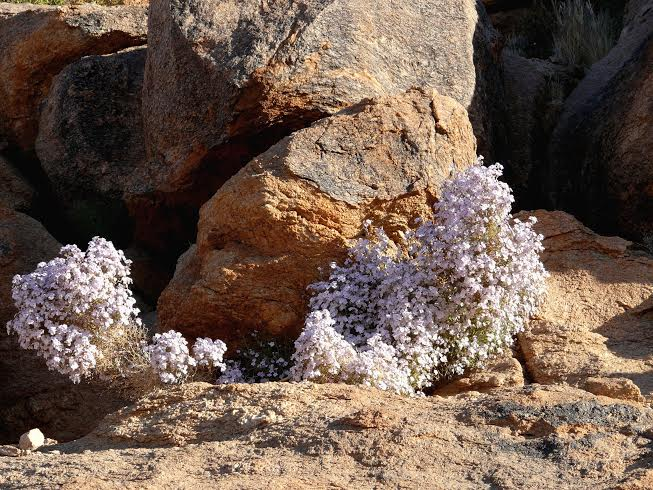
Near Augrabies

== External links to images ==
- iSpot gallery
- Operation Wildflower
