= Scoparia =

Scoparia may refer to:

- Scoparia (moth), a genus of moths
- Scoparia (plant), a genus of plants

== See also ==
- Scoparius (disambiguation)
