= Hebenstretia kamiesbergensis =

Scientific classification
- Kingdom: Plantae
- Clade: Tracheophytes
- Clade: Angiosperms
- Clade: Eudicots
- Clade: Asterids
- Order: Lamiales
- Family: Scrophulariaceae
- Genus: Hebenstretia
- Species: H. kamiesbergensis

Binomial name
- Hebenstretia kamiesbergensis Roessler

South African plant species

Hebenstretia kamiesbergensis, the Kamiesberg slugwort, is a species of plant from the Kamiesberg Mountains in South Africa. It belongs to the figwort family.

== Description ==
This branched shrub grows 50–60 cm (20–24 in) tall. The linear leaves may curve inwards or outwards and have many teeth. Flowers are present in spikes between September and December. The spikes may be densely flowered or be long. The flowers are white with yellow spots and hairy calyx. The fruit is a rounded oblong that is swollen on one side. The upper mericarp is shield shaped.

== Distribution and habitat ==
This plant is endemic to the Kamiesberg Mountains in the Northern Cape of South Africa. It grows on the upper slopes.

== Etymology ==
This species is named after the mountains in which it grows.
