= Manulea schaeferi =

Scientific classification
- Kingdom: Plantae
- Clade: Tracheophytes
- Clade: Angiosperms
- Clade: Eudicots
- Clade: Asterids
- Order: Lamiales
- Family: Scrophulariaceae
- Genus: Manulea
- Species: M. schaeferi

Binomial name
- Manulea schaeferi Pilg.

Southern African plant species

Manulea schaeferi is a species of plant from southern Africa. It grows in southern Namibia and the north-western parts of South Africa.

== Description ==
This annual herb grows 2–18 cm (0.79–7.09 in) tall. It has few or many tufted branches originating from the base of the plant. They are crowded together in small but distinct groups and some stems may have one or two branches near the base. The stems are glandular and are covered in small, down-like hairs. They may have a few reduced leaves low down on the stem. The radical leaves (leaves which originate at the base of the stem or below ground) are oppositely arranged and cross each other. The bases are cone-shaped and each leaf tapers to a petiolar part that is at least half as long as the length of the blade.

Flowers are borne in terminal racemes. The flowers can be quite dense at first, but they spread as they open. The densely hairy corolla tube ranges from white to a mauve-blue in colour and change colour on individual plants. There is some white or yellow around the mouth and in the throat. Each flower has four stamens that are just visible in the mouth. The flowers produce capsules as fruits. They contain violet-blue or pale seeds.

=== Similar species ===
This species is easily confused with Manulea nervosa. It can most easily be distinguished by its calyx, which is lobed nearly to the base in M. schaeferi while the calyx of M. nervosa is bilabiate with both the lips being lobed less than halfway. The lobes of M. schaeferi are narrower relative to the length. M. schaeferi also tends to have smaller flowers. The range of M. nervosa is more to the north and west, relative to that of M. schaeferi.

== Distribution and habitat ==
This plant is endemic to South Africa and Namibia, where it prefers dry habitats. It is found at altitudes of 700–1,005 m (2,297–3,297 ft). It grows between Upington, Kenhardt, Prieska and Kakamas in the Northern Cape of South Africa. In Namibia, it is found growing between Aus, Keetmanshoop and Warmbaths.

== Conservation ==
This plant is considered to be of least concern.
