= Camptoloma =

Camptoloma is the scientific name of two genera of organisms and may refer to:

- Camptoloma (moth), a genus of insects in the family Nolidae
- Camptoloma (plant), a genus of plants in the family Scrophulariaceae
