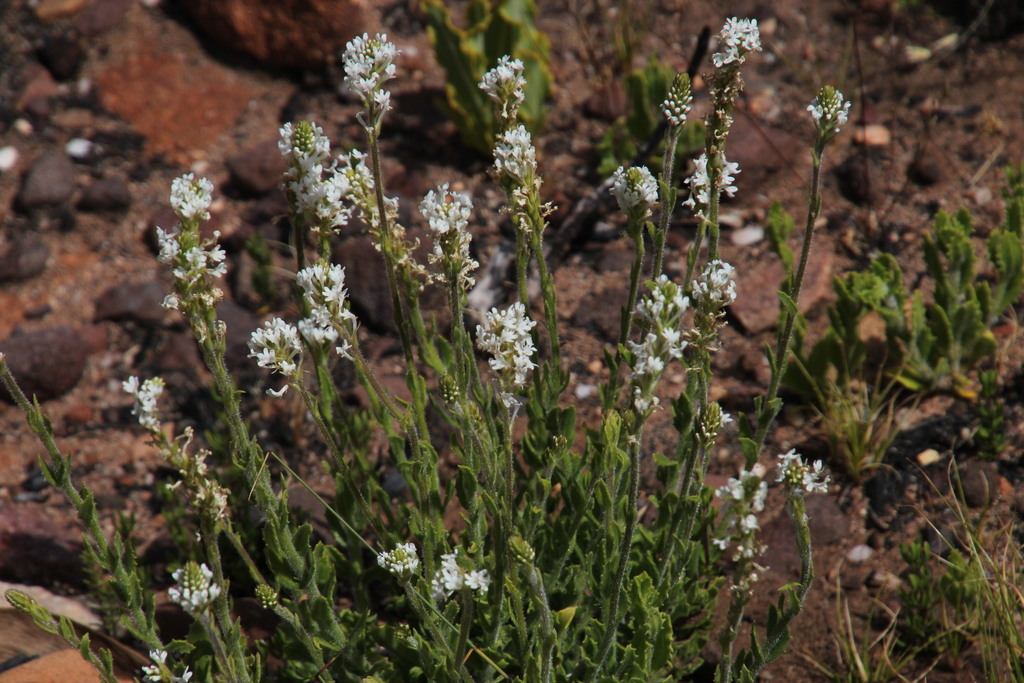

Scientific classification
- Kingdom: Plantae
- Clade: Tracheophytes
- Clade: Angiosperms
- Clade: Eudicots
- Clade: Asterids
- Order: Lamiales
- Family: Scrophulariaceae
- Genus: Hebenstretia
- Species: H. lanceolata

Binomial name
- Hebenstretia lanceolata (E.Mey.) Rolfe

Synonyms
- Hebenstreitia lanceolata Rolfe; Hebenstretia leucostachys Schltr.; Polycenia lanceolata E.Mey.

= Hebenstretia lanceolata =

South African plant species

Hebenstretia lanceolata is a species of plant from South Africa. It belongs to the figwort family.

== Description ==
This hairy shrub grows 20–60 cm (7.9–23.6 in) tall. the leaves are broad and toothed with hairy bracts. Flowers are present between September and November. They grow in spikes and are white with orange markings. They are hairy below the lobes and the calyx has a tooth at the tip. The fruit is a vacuolate ellipsoid with two approximately equal mericarps.

== Distribution and habitat ==
This plant is endemic to the Western Cape of South Africa. It grows on sandstone slopes between the Cedarberg and Stellenbosch at an altitude of 460–1,220 m (1,510–4,000 ft).

== Conservation ==
Hebenstretia lanceolata is classified as being of least concern.
