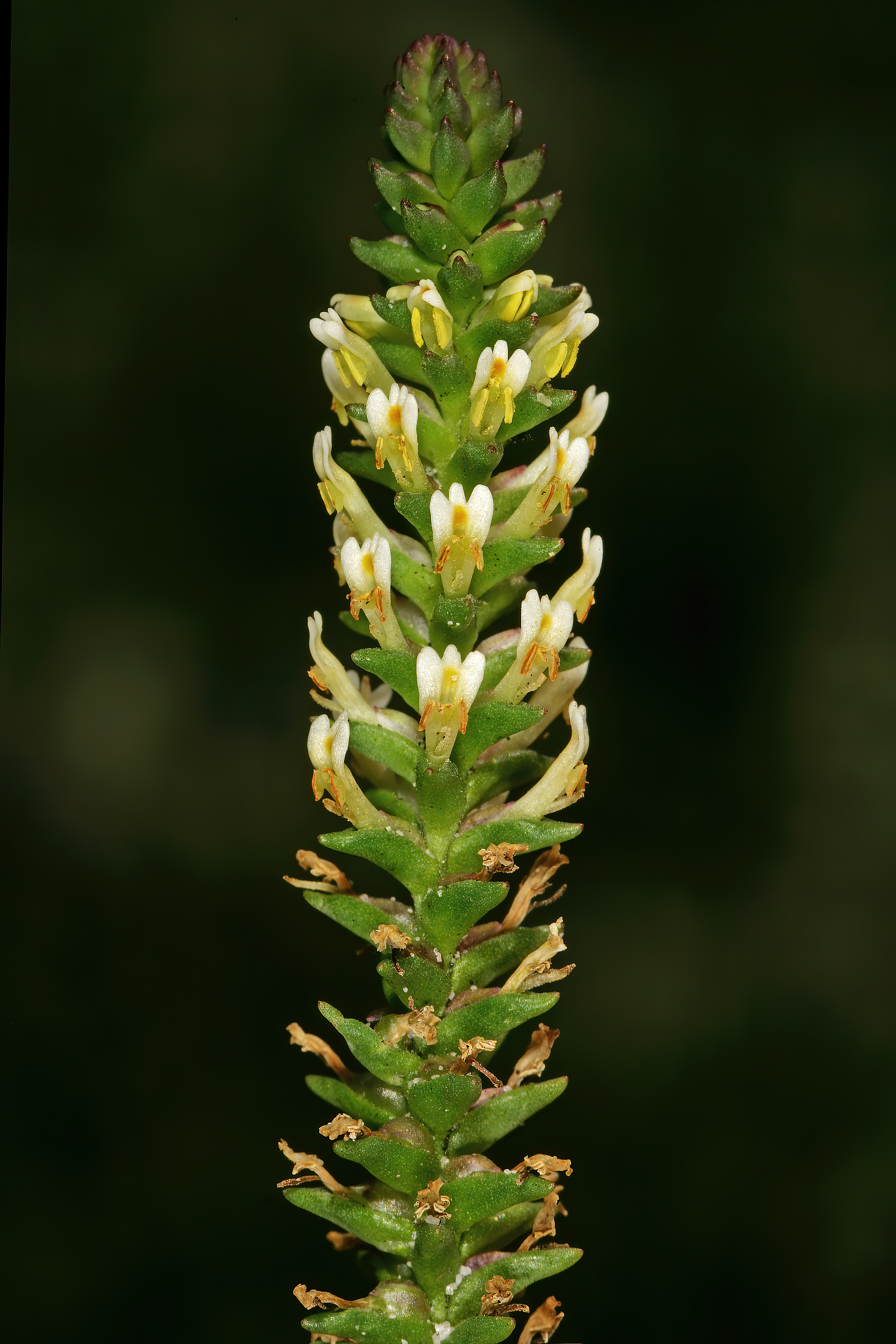
- Hebenstretia fastigiosa inflorescence

Scientific classification
- Kingdom: Plantae
- Clade: Tracheophytes
- Clade: Angiosperms
- Clade: Eudicots
- Clade: Asterids
- Order: Lamiales
- Family: Scrophulariaceae
- Genus: Hebenstretia
- Species: H. fastigiosa

Binomial name
- Hebenstretia fastigiosa Jaroscz

Synonyms
- Hebenstretia fastigiata Steud.; Hebenstretia macrostylis Schltr.

= Hebenstretia fastigiosa =

South African plant species

Hebenstretia fastigiosa is a species of plant from South Africa. It belongs to the figwort family.

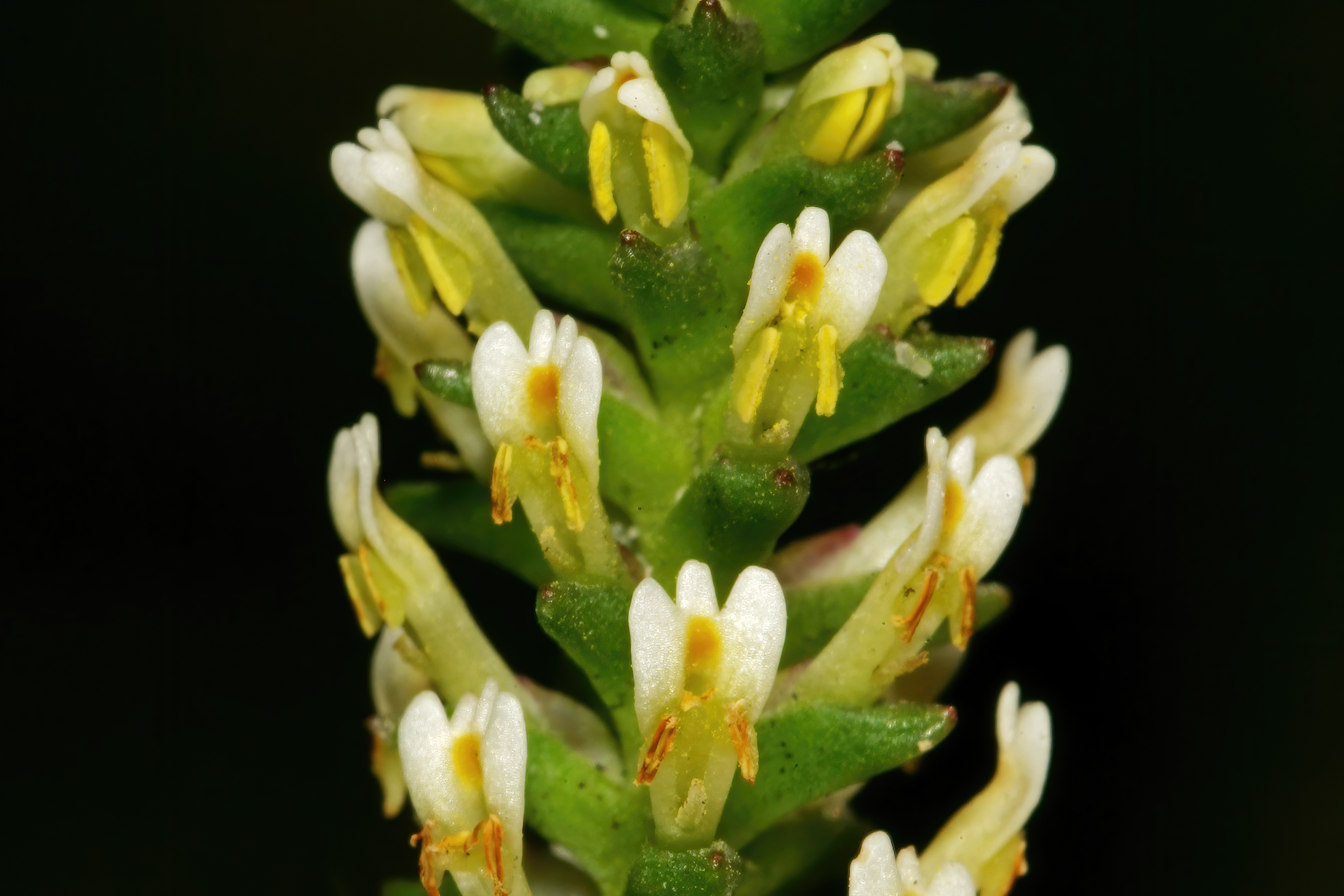
Hebenstretia fastigiosa flowers on an inflorescence

== Description ==
This annual grows up to 45 cm (18 in) tall. It has suberect branches with narrow, slightly toothed leaves. Long spikes of flowers are present between August and October. They are white and hairless with sessile anthers. The fruit is top-shaped and pointed. The upper mericarp is larger.

== Distribution and habitat ==
This plant is endemic to the Western Cape of South Africa. It grows on rocky slopes between Pakhuis and the Cape peninsula at elevations of 105–914 m (344–2,999 ft). It grows in sandstone and granite fynbos areas.

== Conservation ==
This plant is classified as being of least concern by the South African National Biodiversity Institute. While it is declining in some areas due to urbanisation, this decline is not deemed significant enough to give it a higher rating. It has several fragmented subpopulations as a consequence of historical land change for agriculture. As it is a habitat specialist, it is unlikely that Hebenstretia fastigiosa is suitable for cultivation.
