= Phyllopodium =

Phyllopodium may refer to:

- Phyllopodium (beetle), a genus of beetles in the family Cetoniidae
- Phyllopodium (plant), a genus of plants in the family Scrophulariaceae
