= Ghiesbreghtia =

Ghiesbreghtia is taxon synonym for three genera of flowering plants:

- Ghiesbreghtia Roezl, a synonym of Agave L.
- Ghiesbreghtia A.Rich. & Galeotti, a synonym of Calanthe R.Br.
- Ghiesbreghtia A.Gray, a synonym of Eremogeton Standl. & L.O.Williams
