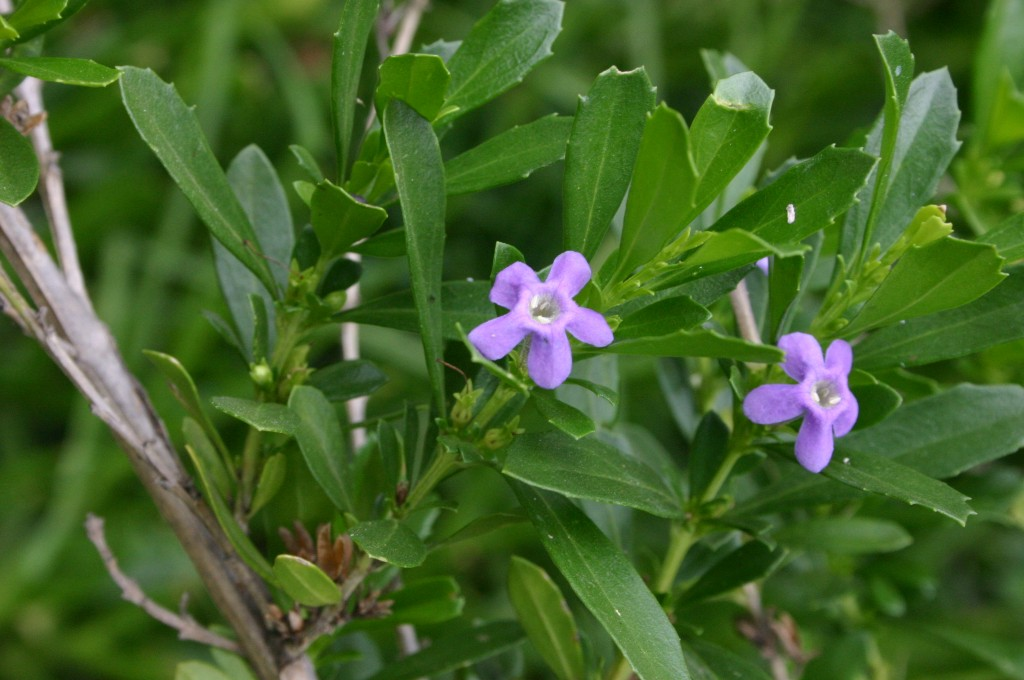

Scientific classification
- Kingdom: Plantae
- Clade: Tracheophytes
- Clade: Angiosperms
- Clade: Eudicots
- Clade: Asterids
- Order: Lamiales
- Family: Scrophulariaceae
- Genus: Freylinia
- Species: F. tropica

Binomial name
- Freylinia tropica S.Moore

= Freylinia tropica =

Species of flowering plant

Freylinia tropica is a Southern African shrub with lax, spreading branches and found in the South African province of Limpopo and in Zimbabwe.

Named after the botanist, Pietro Lorenzo, the last Count of Freylino, owner of a famous garden at Buttigliera d'Asti near Turin in Italy in the early 19th century.
