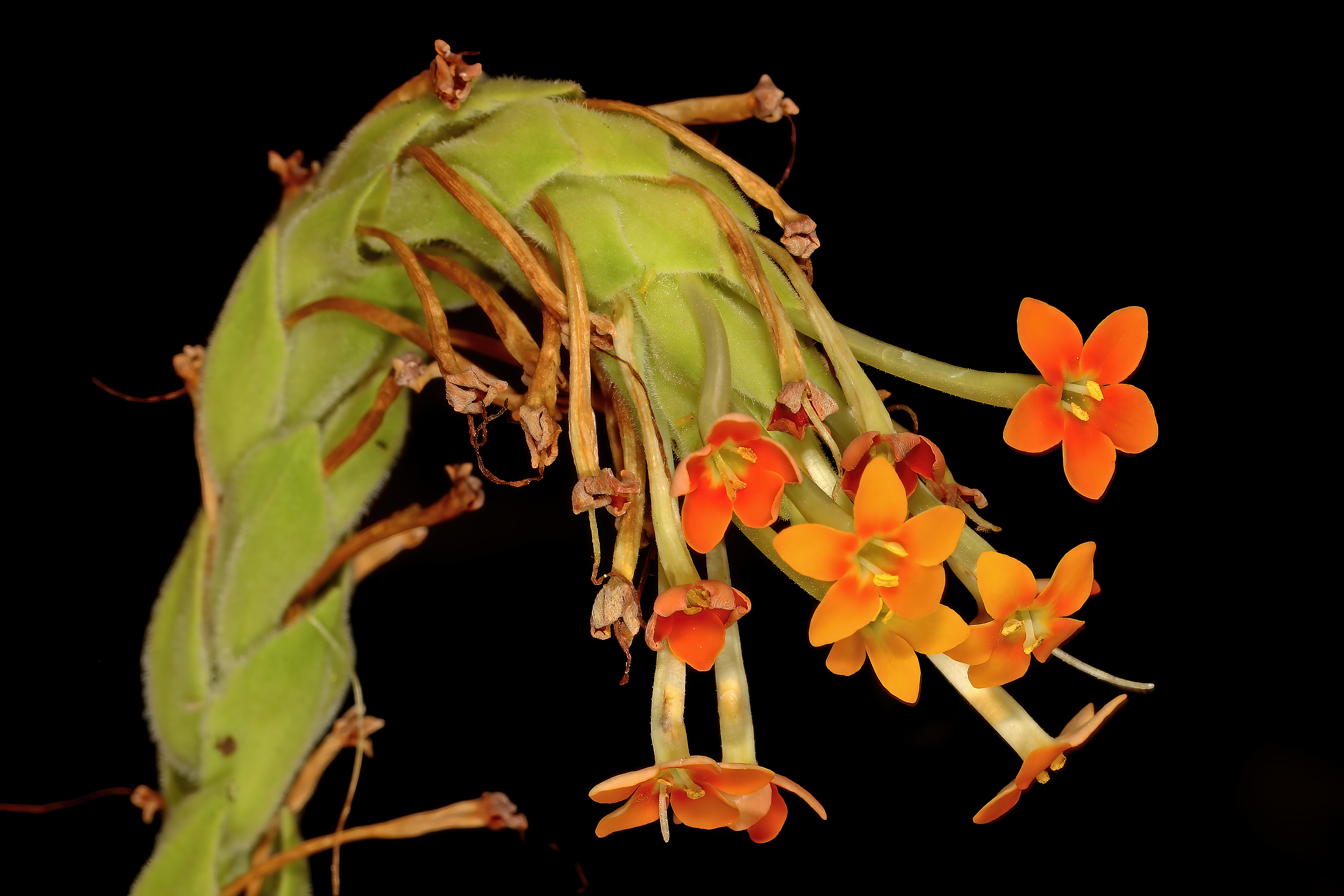
- Close-up of flowers

Scientific classification
- Kingdom: Plantae
- Clade: Embryophytes
- Clade: Tracheophytes
- Clade: Angiosperms
- Clade: Eudicots
- Clade: Asterids
- Order: Lamiales
- Family: Scrophulariaceae
- Genus: Glumicalyx
- Species: G. goseloides

Binomial name
- Glumicalyx goseloides (Diels) Hilliard & B.L.Burtt

Synonyms
- Zaluzianskya goseloides Diels

= Glumicalyx goseloides =

Species of flowering plant

Glumicalyx goseloides, the nodding chocolate flower, is a species of flowering plant in the family Scrophulariaceae, native to high-elevation areas of South Africa. A clumping perennial reaching 15 in (38 cm), and possibly hardy in USDA zones 6 through 9, its flowers give off a chocolate scent. It is not readily available in commerce.
