= Hebenstretia glaucescens =

Scientific classification
- Kingdom: Plantae
- Clade: Tracheophytes
- Clade: Angiosperms
- Clade: Eudicots
- Clade: Asterids
- Order: Lamiales
- Family: Scrophulariaceae
- Genus: Hebenstretia
- Species: H. glaucescens

Binomial name
- Hebenstretia glaucescens Schltr.

South African plant species

Hebenstretia glaucescens is a species of plant from South Africa. It belongs to the family Scrophulariaceae.

== Description ==
This annual grows 3–15 cm (1.2–5.9 in) tall. It has side branches that grow along the ground without rooting and linear or lance-shaped leaves. The margins are not toothed. Flowers are present between July and September. They grow in short, compact spikes. The fruit has a broad oblong shape. The mericarps may be equal or unequal. If unequal, the upper one is deeply concave on the inner face and the lower one has two deep longitudinal grooves on the inner face.

== Distribution and habitat ==
This species is endemic to the Western Cape of South Africa. It is found at elevations of 140–1,370 m (460–4,490 ft)140 – 1370m. It grows on open flats between southern Knersvlakte, southern Bushmanland, Calvinia and Tanqua Karoo.

== Conservation ==
This species is classified as being of least concern.
