= Peliostomum origanoides =

Scientific classification
- Kingdom: Plantae
- Clade: Embryophytes
- Clade: Tracheophytes
- Clade: Spermatophytes
- Clade: Angiosperms
- Clade: Eudicots
- Clade: Asterids
- Order: Lamiales
- Family: Scrophulariaceae
- Genus: Peliostomum
- Species: P. origanoides

Binomial name
- Peliostomum origanoides E. Mey. ex Benth.

Species of plant

Peliostomum origanoides is a species of flowering plant native to Southern Africa, belonging to the family Scrophulariaceae. It is known for its historical use as a traditional medicinal plant in South Africa for various ailments, including stomach problems, diarrhea, fever, and rashes, though specific parts used vary with the ailment.
