= Hebenstretia hamulosa =

Scientific classification
- Kingdom: Plantae
- Clade: Embryophytes
- Clade: Tracheophytes
- Clade: Spermatophytes
- Clade: Angiosperms
- Clade: Eudicots
- Clade: Asterids
- Order: Lamiales
- Family: Scrophulariaceae
- Genus: Hebenstretia
- Species: H. hamulosa

Binomial name
- Hebenstretia hamulosa E.Mey.

South African plant species

Hebenstretia hamulosa is a species of flowering plant in the figwort family, Scrophulariaceae. It is endemic to the Cape Provinces in South Africa.

== Description ==
This erect annual grows 5–15 cm (2.0–5.9 in) tall. It has many hairy branches growing from the base. The hairs are coarse and curve backwards. The leaves are linear with margins that range from being entire to being obscurely toothed. White flowers are found in spikes between August and October. The calyx is hairy and the hook-shaped bracts curved downwards. The two mericarps making up the fruit are of equal size. They are both round in cross-section.

== Distribution and habitat ==
Hebenstretia hamulosa is endemic to the Northern Cape of South Africa. It grows on slopes between Steinkopf and Bitterfontein at elevations of 455–915 m (1,493–3,002 ft).

== Conservation ==
This species is considered to be of least concern.
