= Hebenstretia minutiflora =

Scientific classification
- Kingdom: Plantae
- Clade: Tracheophytes
- Clade: Angiosperms
- Clade: Eudicots
- Clade: Asterids
- Order: Lamiales
- Family: Scrophulariaceae
- Genus: Hebenstretia
- Species: H. minutiflora

Binomial name
- Hebenstretia minutiflora Rolfe

Synonyms
- Hebenstretia parviflora var. denticulata Choisy

South African plant species

Hebenstretia minutiflora is a species of plant from South Africa. It belongs to the figwort family.

== Description ==
This spreading herb grows 5–20 cm (2.0–7.9 in) tall. It branches at the base. Individuals may survive for only one year (annual) or may be present for several years (perennial). The leaves are lance-shaped and toothed. White flowers are present between September and December. They grow in spikes. The fruit is an oblong capsule with two equal mericarps.

== Distribution and habitat ==
This species in endemic to the Northern Cape of South Africa. It grows on south-facing slopes on the Kamiesberg Mountains at an elevation of 1,220–1,525 m (4,003–5,003 ft).

== Conservation ==
This species is classified as being of least concern.
