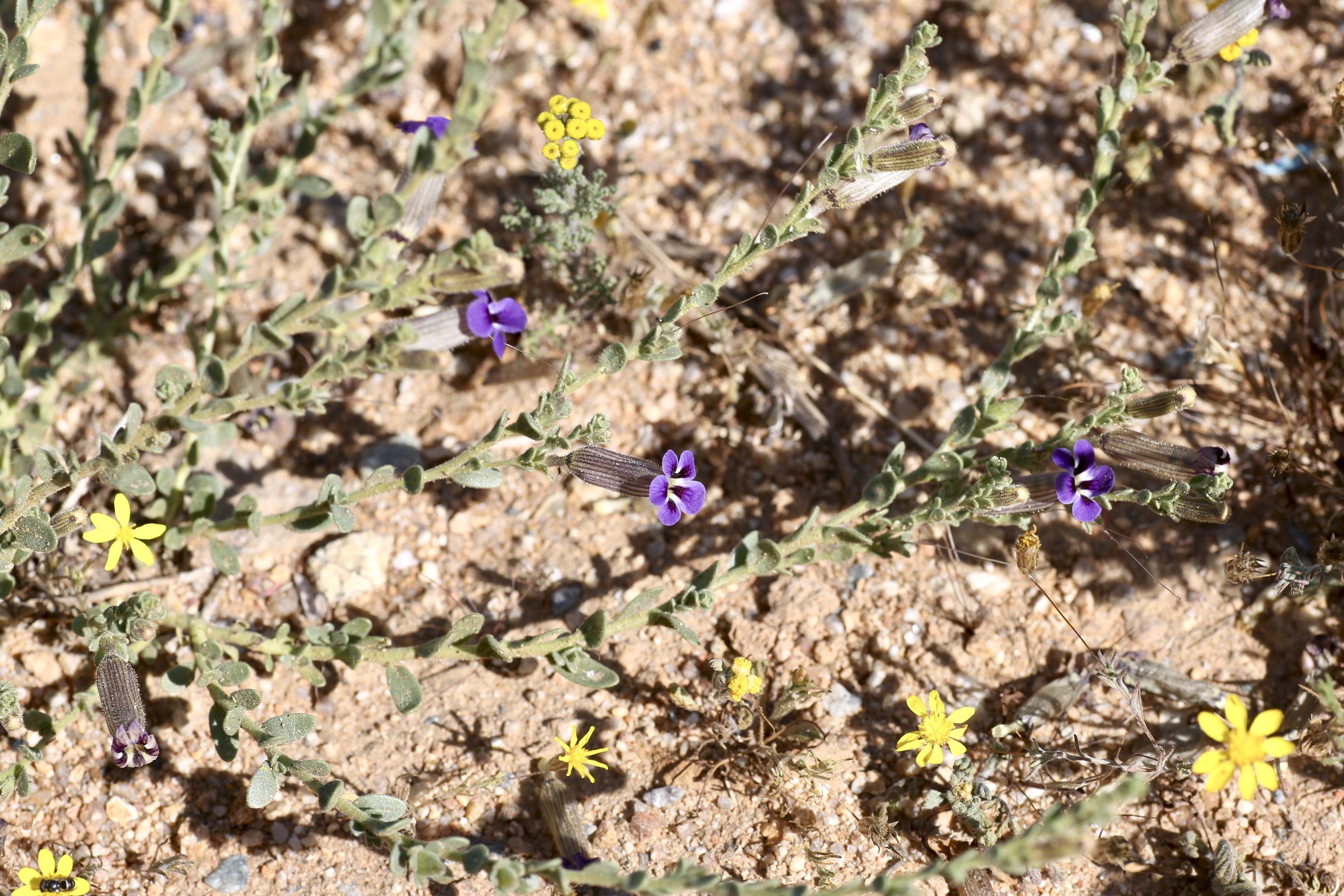

Scientific classification
- Kingdom: Plantae
- Clade: Embryophytes
- Clade: Tracheophytes
- Clade: Spermatophytes
- Clade: Angiosperms
- Clade: Eudicots
- Clade: Asterids
- Order: Lamiales
- Family: Scrophulariaceae
- Genus: Peliostomum
- Species: P. virgatum

Binomial name
- Peliostomum virgatum E. Mey. ex Benth.

= Peliostomum virgatum =

Species of plant

Peliostomum virgatum, the twiggy veld violet, is a species of flowering plant in the family Scrophulariaceae.
