= F. crispa =

F. crispa may refer to:

- Ferraria crispa, a flowering plant species
- Freylinia crispa, a shrub species

== See also ==
- Crispa (disambiguation)
