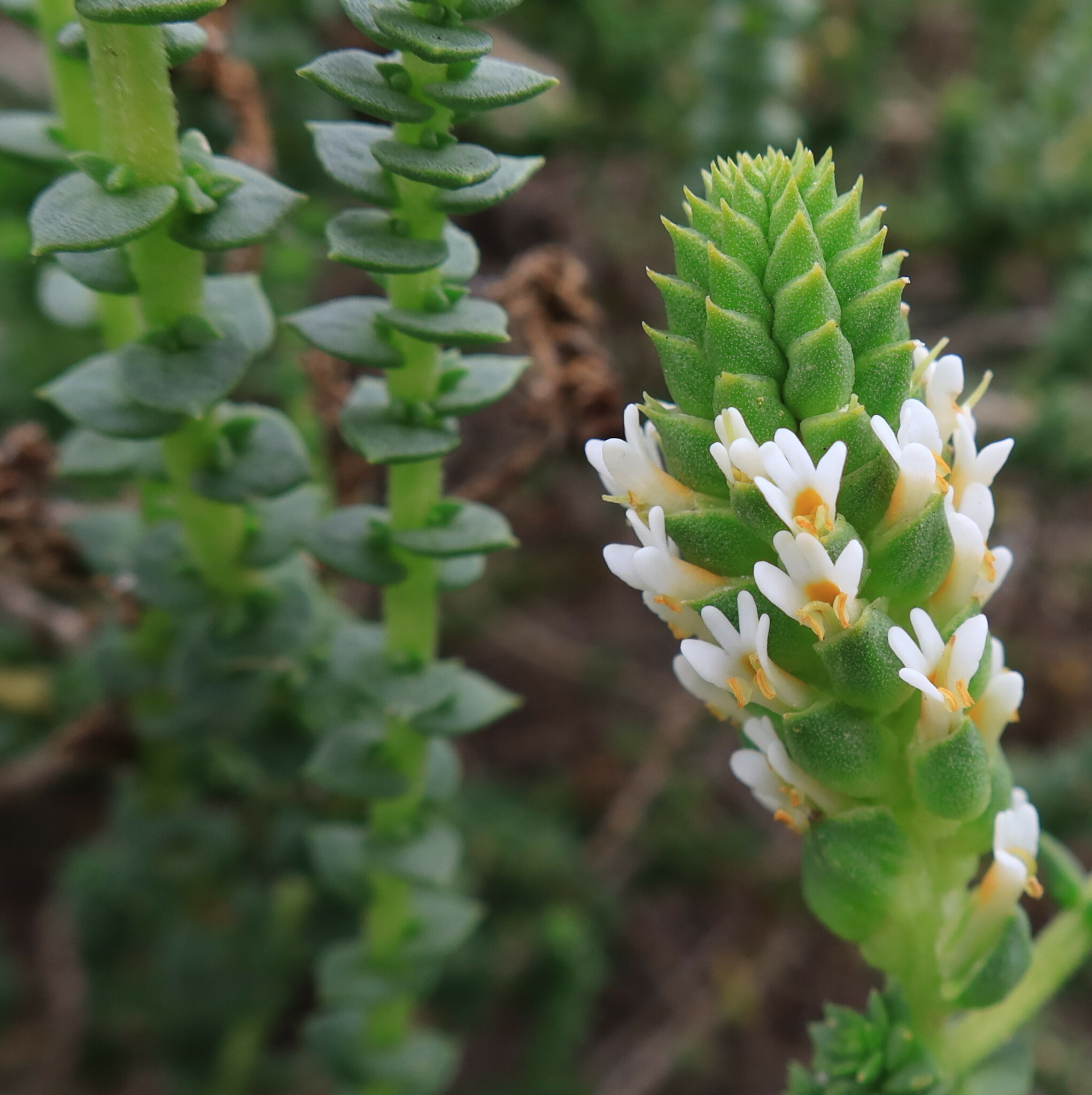

Scientific classification
- Kingdom: Plantae
- Clade: Tracheophytes
- Clade: Angiosperms
- Clade: Eudicots
- Clade: Asterids
- Order: Lamiales
- Family: Scrophulariaceae
- Genus: Hebenstretia
- Species: H. cordata

Binomial name
- Hebenstretia cordata L.

= Hebenstretia cordata =

Species of plant

Hebenstretia cordata, also known by its common name beach slugwort, is a species of flowering plant from the family Scrophulariaceae.
