= Peliostomum calycinum =

Scientific classification
- Kingdom: Plantae
- Clade: Tracheophytes
- Clade: Angiosperms
- Clade: Eudicots
- Clade: Asterids
- Order: Lamiales
- Family: Scrophulariaceae
- Genus: Peliostomum
- Species: P. calycinum

Binomial name
- Peliostomum calycinum N. E. Br.

Species of plant

Peliostomum calycinum is a flowering plant belonging to the Scrophulariaceae family, native to Southern Africa. This species is a shrublet, growing up to 300 mm tall, with linear leaves and blue or violet flowers that bloom from November to March. It is found in the Lowveld sour bushveld habitat and was described by N.E. Brown in 1894.
