= Peliostomum viscosum =

Scientific classification
- Kingdom: Plantae
- Clade: Embryophytes
- Clade: Tracheophytes
- Clade: Spermatophytes
- Clade: Angiosperms
- Clade: Eudicots
- Clade: Asterids
- Order: Lamiales
- Family: Scrophulariaceae
- Genus: Peliostomum
- Species: P. viscosum

Binomial name
- Peliostomum viscosum E. Mey. ex Benth.

Species of plant

Peliostomum viscosum, the viscid peliostomum, is a species of flowering plant in the genus Peliostomum, native to Southern Africa, particularly the Namibian and Northern Cape regions. It belongs to the family Scrophulariaceae. This perennial, small woody shrub is a succulent, thriving in terrestrial, desert environments.
