= Rhabdotosperma ledermannii =

Conservation status
- Vulnerable (IUCN 3.1)

Scientific classification
- Kingdom: Plantae
- Clade: Tracheophytes
- Clade: Angiosperms
- Clade: Eudicots
- Clade: Asterids
- Order: Lamiales
- Family: Scrophulariaceae
- Genus: Rhabdotosperma
- Species: R. ledermannii

Binomial name
- Rhabdotosperma ledermannii (Schltr. ex Murb.) Hartl

Species of plant

Rhabdotosperma ledermannii is a species of flowering plant in the family Scrophulariaceae. It is found in Cameroon and Nigeria. Its natural habitats are subtropical or tropical moist montane forests and subtropical or tropical high-altitude grassland. It is threatened by habitat loss.
