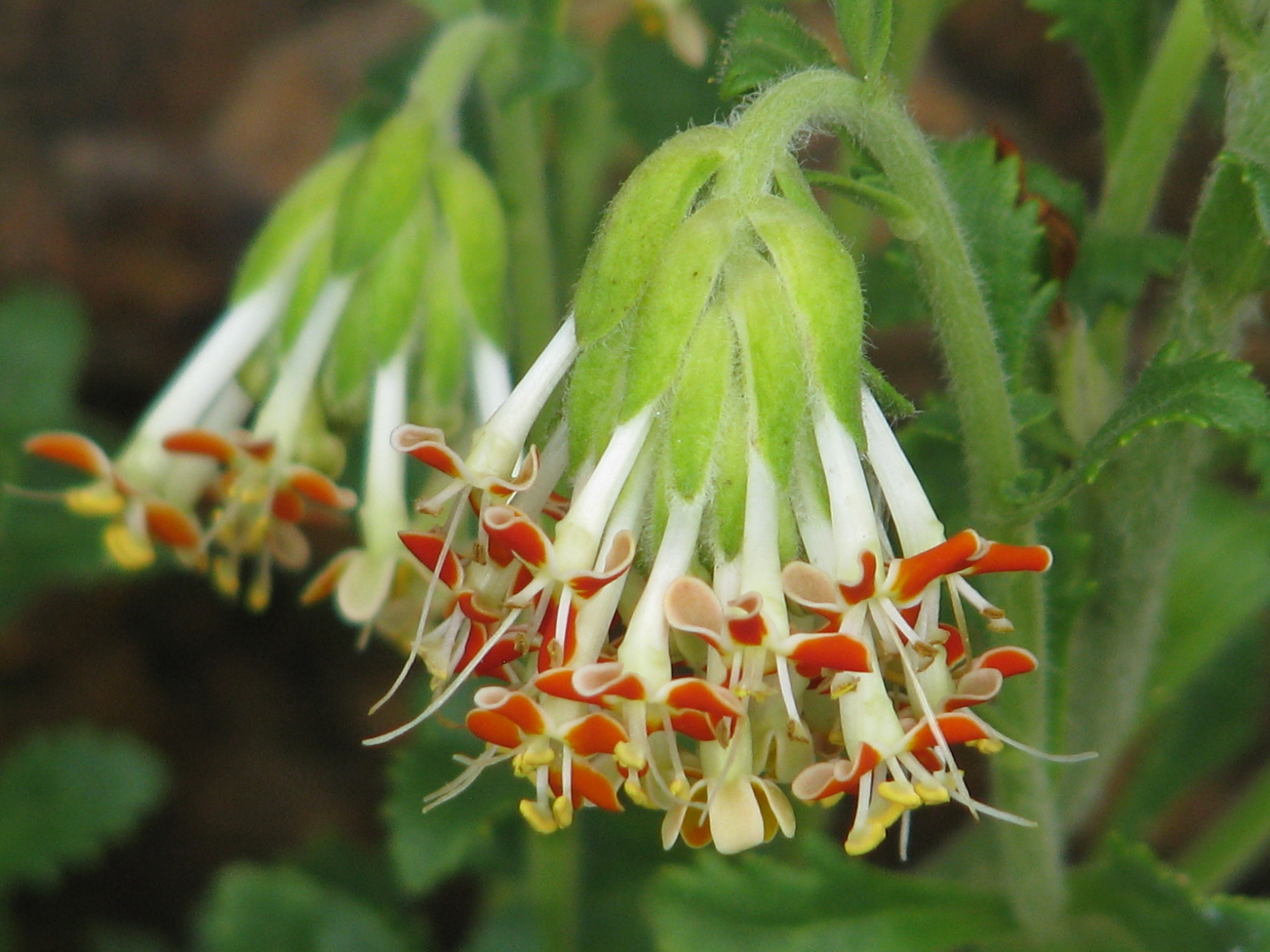

Scientific classification
- Kingdom: Plantae
- Clade: Tracheophytes
- Clade: Angiosperms
- Clade: Eudicots
- Clade: Asterids
- Order: Lamiales
- Family: Scrophulariaceae
- Genus: Glumicalyx; Hiern

= Glumicalyx =

Genus of flowering plants

Glumicalyx is a genus of flowering plants belonging to the family Scrophulariaceae.

Its native range is Southern Africa.

Species:

- Glumicalyx apiculatus (E.Mey.) Hilliard & B.L.Burtt
- Glumicalyx flanaganii (Hiern) Hilliard & B.L.Burtt
- Glumicalyx goseloides (Diels) Hilliard & B.L.Burtt
- Glumicalyx lesuticus Hilliard & B.L.Burtt
- Glumicalyx montanus Hiern
- Glumicalyx nutans (Rolfe) Hilliard & B.L.Burtt
