= Hiern =

Hiern is a British surname. Notable people with the surname include:

- Barry Hiern (born 1951), Australian cricketer
- Ross Hiern (1922–1999), Australian cricketer
- William Philip Hiern (1839–1925), British mathematician and botanist

== See also ==
- Hern
