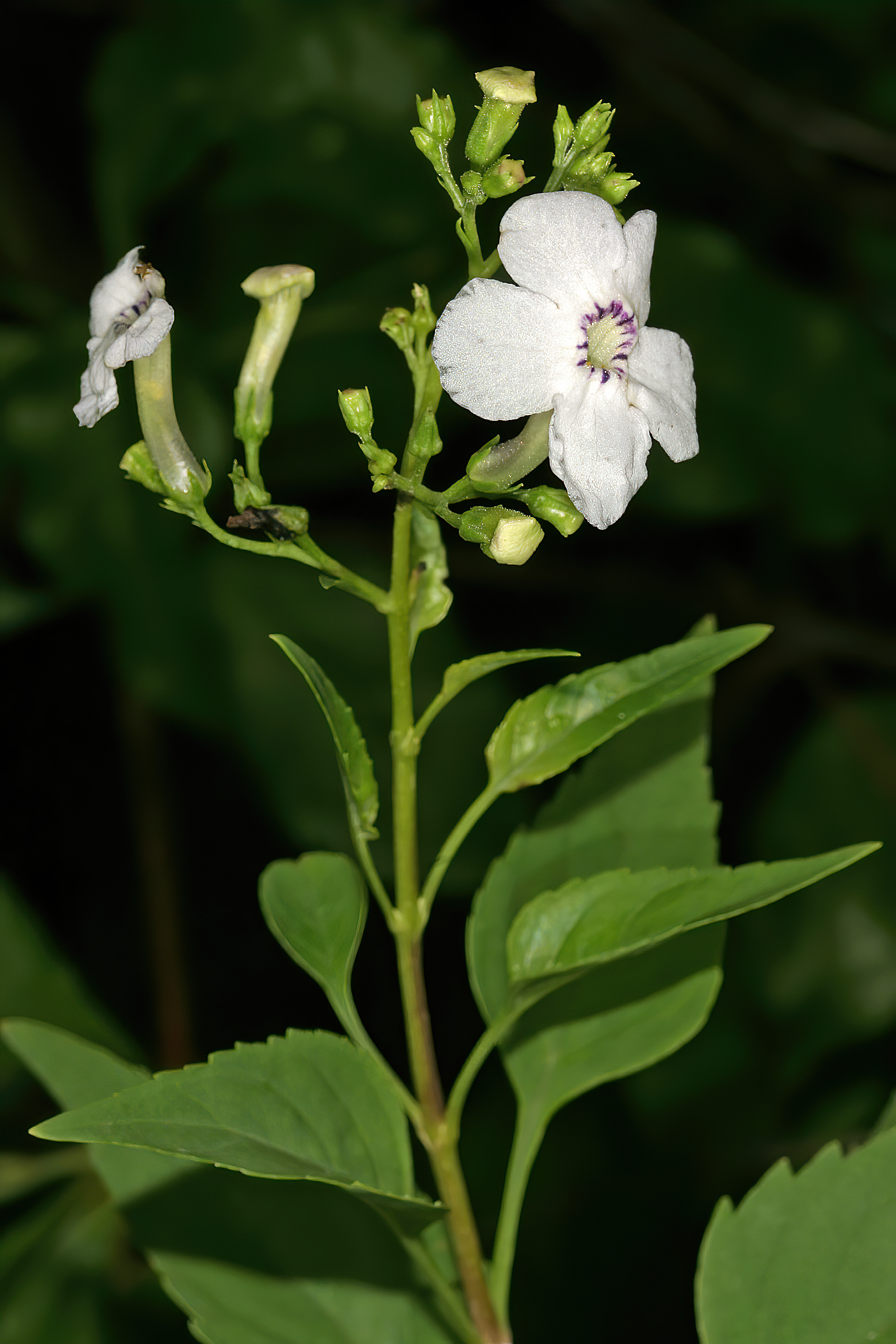
- Manuleopsis dinteri

Scientific classification
- Kingdom: Plantae
- Clade: Tracheophytes
- Clade: Angiosperms
- Clade: Eudicots
- Clade: Asterids
- Order: Lamiales
- Family: Scrophulariaceae
- Genus: Manuleopsis; Thell.
- Species: M. dinteri

Binomial name
- Manuleopsis dinteri Thell.

= Manuleopsis =

Genus of plants

Manuleopsis is a monotypic genus of flowering plants belonging to the family Scrophulariaceae. The only species is Manuleopsis dinteri.

Its native range is Namibia.
