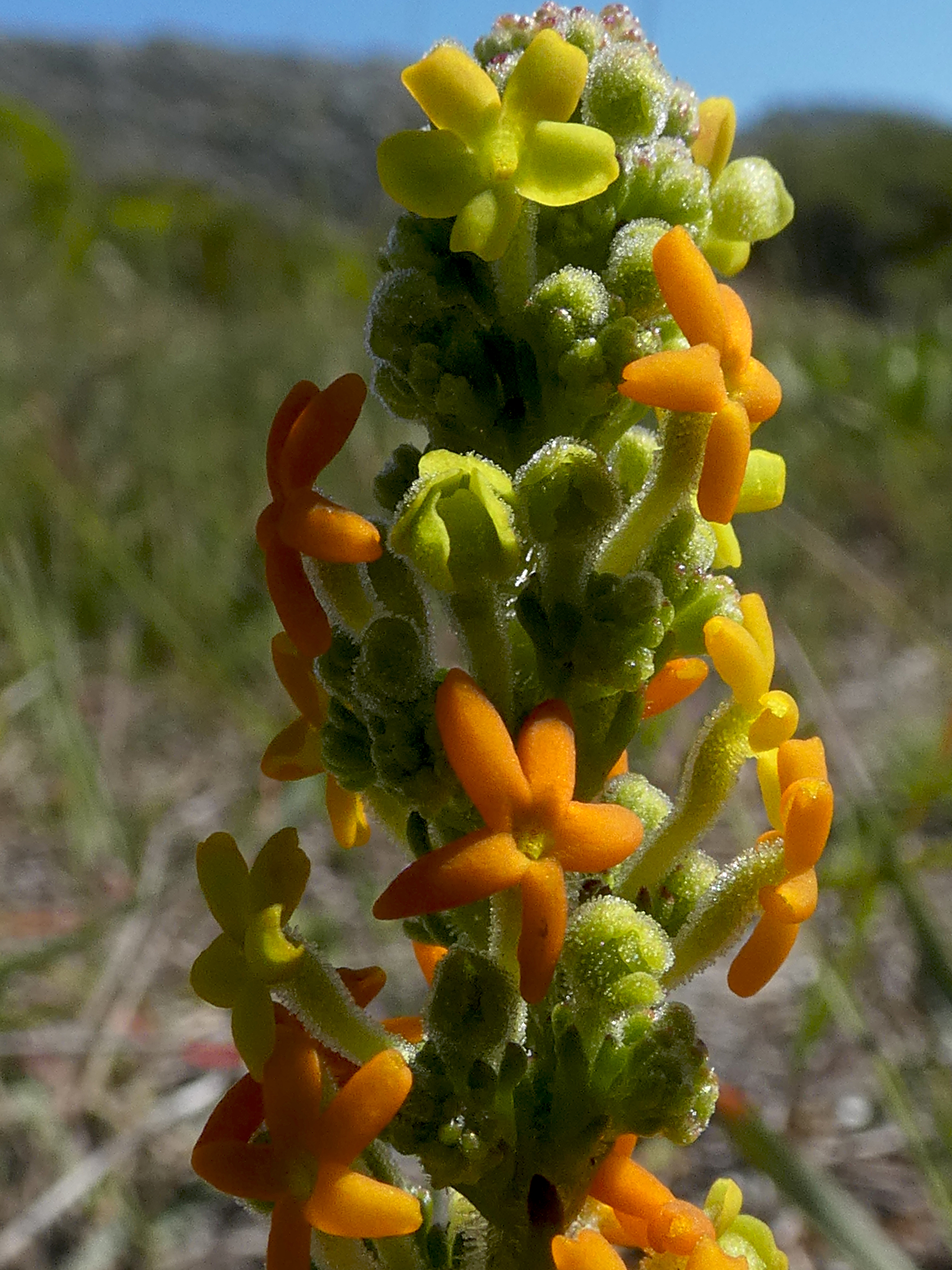

Scientific classification
- Kingdom: Plantae
- Clade: Tracheophytes
- Clade: Angiosperms
- Clade: Eudicots
- Clade: Asterids
- Order: Lamiales
- Family: Scrophulariaceae
- Genus: Manulea; L.

= Manulea (plant) =

Genus of flowering plants

Manulea is a genus of flowering plants belonging to the family Scrophulariaceae.

Its native range is Africa.

Species:

- Manulea acutiloba Hilliard
- Manulea adenocalyx Hilliard
- Manulea adenodes Hilliard
- Manulea altissima L.f.
- Manulea androsacea E.Mey. ex Benth.
- Manulea annua (Hiern) Hilliard
- Manulea arabidea Schltr. ex Hiern
- Manulea aridicola Hilliard
- Manulea augei (Hiern) Hilliard
- Manulea bellidifolia Benth.
- Manulea buchneroides Hilliard & B.L.Burtt
- Manulea burchellii Hiern
- Manulea caledonica Hilliard
- Manulea cephalotes Thunb.
- Manulea cheiranthus L.
- Manulea chrysantha Hilliard
- Manulea cinerea Hilliard
- Manulea conferta Pilg.
- Manulea corymbosa L.f.
- Manulea crassifolia Benth.
- Manulea decipiens Hilliard
- Manulea derustiana Hilliard
- Manulea deserticola Hilliard
- Manulea diandra Hilliard
- Manulea dregei Hilliard & B.L.Burtt
- Manulea dubia (Skan) Overkott ex Roessler
- Manulea exigua Hilliard
- Manulea flanaganii Hilliard
- Manulea florifera Hilliard & B.L.Burtt
- Manulea fragrans Schltr.
- Manulea gariepina Benth.
- Manulea gariesiana Hilliard
- Manulea glandulosa E.Phillips
- Manulea incana Thunb.
- Manulea juncea Benth.
- Manulea karrooica Hilliard
- Manulea latiloba Hilliard
- Manulea laxa Schltr.
- Manulea leiostachys Benth.
- Manulea leptosiphon Thell.
- Manulea linearifolia Hilliard
- Manulea minor Diels
- Manulea minuscula Hilliard
- Manulea montana Hilliard
- Manulea multispicata Hilliard
- Manulea namibensis (Roessler) Hilliard
- Manulea nervosa E.Mey. ex Benth.
- Manulea obovata Benth.
- Manulea ovatifolia Hilliard
- Manulea paniculata Benth.
- Manulea parviflora Benth.
- Manulea paucibarbata Hilliard
- Manulea pillansii Hilliard
- Manulea platystigma Hilliard & B.L.Burtt
- Manulea plurirosulata Hilliard
- Manulea praeterita Hilliard
- Manulea psilostoma Hilliard
- Manulea pusilla E.Mey. ex Benth.
- Manulea ramulosa Hilliard
- Manulea rhodantha Hilliard
- Manulea rhodesiana S.Moore
- Manulea rigida Benth.
- Manulea robusta Pilg.
- Manulea rubra (P.J.Bergius) L.f.
- Manulea schaeferi Pilg.
- Manulea silenoides E.Mey. ex Benth.
- Manulea stellata Benth.
- Manulea tenella Hilliard
- Manulea thyrsiflora L.f.
- Manulea tomentosa (L.) L.
- Manulea turrita Banks ex Benth.
- Manulea virgata Thunb.
