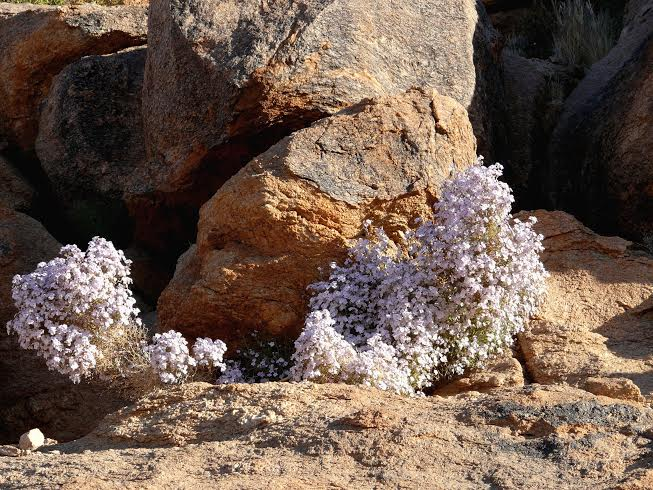
- Jamesbrittenia ramosissima

Scientific classification
- Kingdom: Plantae
- Clade: Embryophytes
- Clade: Tracheophytes
- Clade: Angiosperms
- Clade: Eudicots
- Clade: Asterids
- Order: Lamiales
- Family: Scrophulariaceae
- Tribe: Limoselleae
- Genus: Jamesbrittenia; Kuntze

Species
- See text

= Jamesbrittenia =

Genus of flowering plants

Jamesbrittenia is a genus of flowering plants in the family Scrophulariaceae, disjunctly distributed in southern Africa, Sudan and Egypt, and India and Bangladesh. Subshrubs with profuse flowering, they are amenable to containers, so a number of cultivars and hybrid cultivars have been developed for the garden trade.

== Species ==
Currently the 84 accepted species include:

- Jamesbrittenia accrescens (Hiern) Hilliard
- Jamesbrittenia acutiloba (Pilg.) Hilliard
- Jamesbrittenia adpressa (Dinter) Hilliard
- Jamesbrittenia albanensis Hilliard
- Jamesbrittenia albiflora (I.Verd.) Hilliard
- Jamesbrittenia albobadia Hilliard
- Jamesbrittenia albomarginata Hilliard
- Jamesbrittenia amplexicaulis (Benth.) Hilliard
- Jamesbrittenia angolensis Hilliard
- Jamesbrittenia argentea (L.f.) Hilliard
- Jamesbrittenia aridicola Hilliard
- Jamesbrittenia aspalathoides (Benth.) Hilliard
- Jamesbrittenia aspleniifolia Hilliard
- Jamesbrittenia atropurpurea (Benth.) Hilliard
- Jamesbrittenia aurantiaca (Burch.) Hilliard
- Jamesbrittenia barbata Hilliard
- Jamesbrittenia bergae Lemmer
- Jamesbrittenia beverlyana (Hilliard & B.L.Burtt) Hilliard
- Jamesbrittenia bicolor (Dinter) Hilliard
- Jamesbrittenia breviflora (Schltr.) Hilliard
- Jamesbrittenia burkeana (Benth.) Hilliard
- Jamesbrittenia calciphila Hilliard
- Jamesbrittenia candida Hilliard
- Jamesbrittenia canescens (Benth.) Hilliard
- Jamesbrittenia carvalhoi (Engl.) Hilliard
- Jamesbrittenia chenopodioides Hilliard
- Jamesbrittenia concinna (Hiern) Hilliard
- Jamesbrittenia crassicaulis (Benth.) Hilliard
- Jamesbrittenia dentatisepala (Overkott) Hilliard
- Jamesbrittenia dissecta (Delile) Kuntze
- Jamesbrittenia dolomitica Hilliard
- Jamesbrittenia elegantissima (Schinz) Hilliard
- Jamesbrittenia filicaulis (Benth.) Hilliard
- Jamesbrittenia fimbriata Hilliard
- Jamesbrittenia fleckii (Thell.) Hilliard
- Jamesbrittenia fodina (Wild) Hilliard
- Jamesbrittenia foliolosa (Benth.) Hilliard
- Jamesbrittenia fragilis (Pilg.) Hilliard
- Jamesbrittenia fruticosa (Benth.) Hilliard
- Jamesbrittenia giessii Hilliard
- Jamesbrittenia glutinosa (Benth.) Hilliard
- Jamesbrittenia grandiflora (Galpin) Hilliard
- Jamesbrittenia hereroensis (Engl.) Hilliard
- Jamesbrittenia heucherifolia (Diels) Hilliard
- Jamesbrittenia huillana (Diels) Hilliard
- Jamesbrittenia incisa (Thunb.) Hilliard
- Jamesbrittenia integerrima (Benth.) Hilliard
- Jamesbrittenia jurassica (Hilliard & B.L.Burtt) Hilliard
- Jamesbrittenia kraussiana (Bernh.) Hilliard
- Jamesbrittenia lesutica Hilliard
- Jamesbrittenia lyperioides (Engl.) Hilliard
- Jamesbrittenia macrantha (Codd) Hilliard
- Jamesbrittenia major (Pilg.) Hilliard
- Jamesbrittenia maritima (Hiern) Hilliard
- Jamesbrittenia maxii (Hiern) Hilliard
- Jamesbrittenia megadenia Hilliard
- Jamesbrittenia megaphylla Hilliard
- Jamesbrittenia merxmuelleri (Roessler) Hilliard
- Jamesbrittenia micrantha (Klotzsch) Hilliard
- Jamesbrittenia microphylla (L.f.) Hilliard
- Jamesbrittenia montana (Diels) Hilliard
- Jamesbrittenia multisecta Hilliard
- Jamesbrittenia myriantha Hilliard
- Jamesbrittenia namaquensis Hilliard
- Jamesbrittenia pallida (Pilg.) Hilliard
- Jamesbrittenia pedunculosa (Benth.) Hilliard
- Jamesbrittenia phlogiflora (Benth.) Hilliard
- Jamesbrittenia pilgeriana (Dinter) Hilliard
- Jamesbrittenia pinnatifida (L.f.) Hilliard
- Jamesbrittenia primuliflora (Thell.) Hilliard
- Jamesbrittenia pristisepala (Hiern) Hilliard
- Jamesbrittenia racemosa (Benth.) Hilliard
- Jamesbrittenia ramosissima (Hiern) Hilliard
- Jamesbrittenia sessilifolia (Diels) Hilliard
- Jamesbrittenia silenoides (Hilliard) Hilliard
- Jamesbrittenia stellata Hilliard
- Jamesbrittenia stricta (Benth.) Hilliard
- Jamesbrittenia tenella (Hiern) Hilliard
- Jamesbrittenia tenuifolia (Bernh.) Hilliard
- Jamesbrittenia thunbergii (G.Don) Hilliard
- Jamesbrittenia tortuosa (Benth.) Hilliard
- Jamesbrittenia tysonii (Hiern) Hilliard
- Jamesbrittenia zambesica (R.E.Fr.) Hilliard
- Jamesbrittenia zuurbergensis Hilliard
