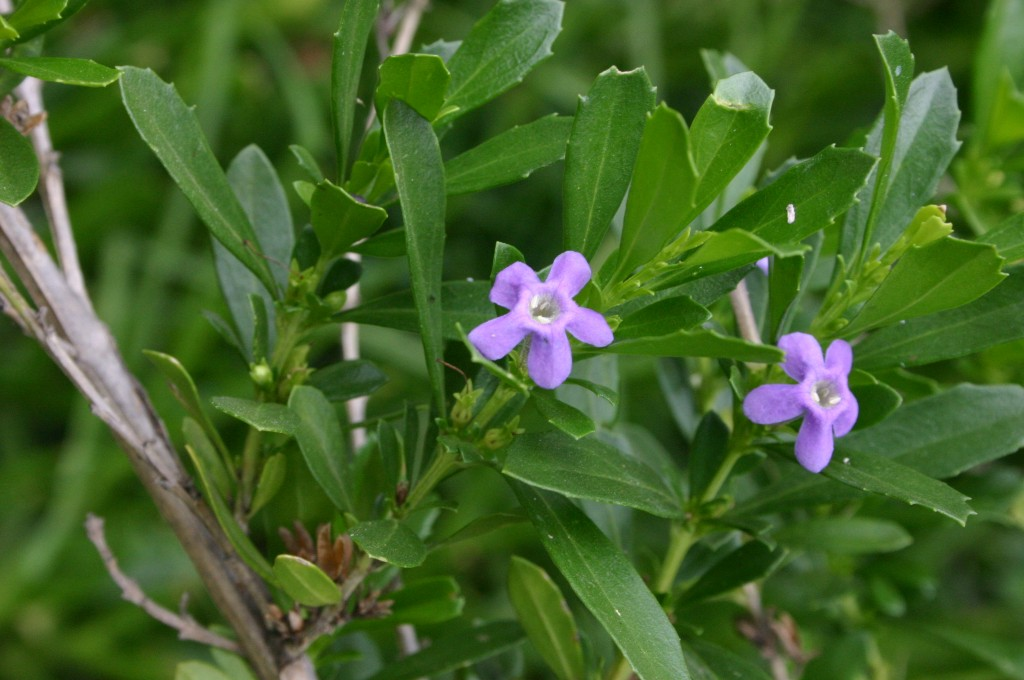
- Freylinia tropica

Scientific classification
- Kingdom: Plantae
- Clade: Tracheophytes
- Clade: Angiosperms
- Clade: Eudicots
- Clade: Asterids
- Order: Lamiales
- Family: Scrophulariaceae
- Genus: Freylinia; Colla

= Freylinia =

Genus of flowering plants

Freylinia is a genus of flowering plants in the figwort family Scrophulariaceae. They are native to Africa.

== Species ==
Species include:

- Freylinia crispa
- Freylinia decurrens
- Freylinia densiflora
- Freylinia helmei
- Freylinia lanceolata
- Freylinia longiflora
- Freylinia tropica
- Freylinia undulata
- Freylinia visseri
- Freylinia vlokii
