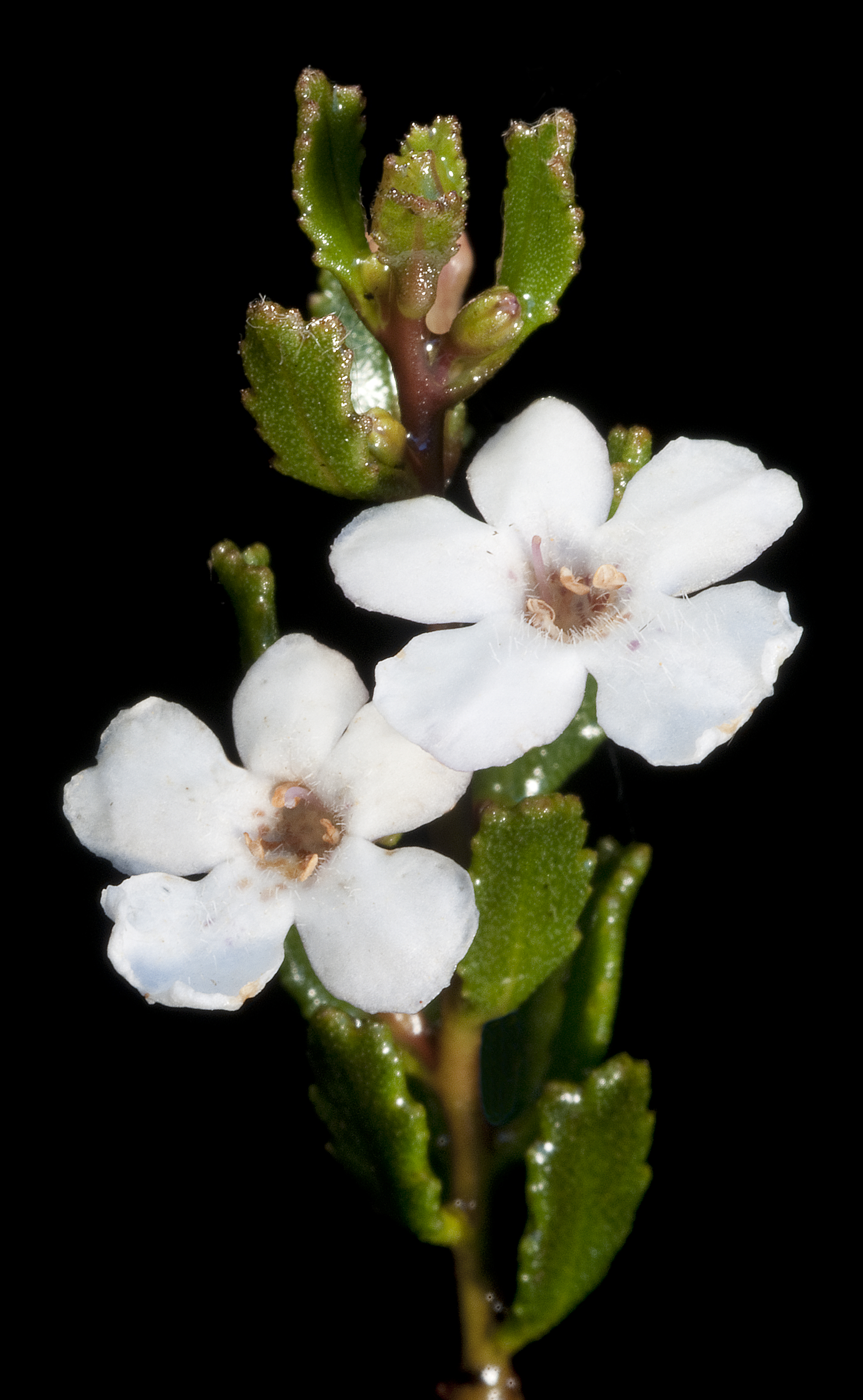

Scientific classification
- Kingdom: Plantae
- Clade: Tracheophytes
- Clade: Angiosperms
- Clade: Eudicots
- Clade: Asterids
- Order: Lamiales
- Family: Scrophulariaceae
- Tribe: Myoporeae
- Genus: Glycocystis; Chinnock
- Species: G. beckeri

Binomial name
- Glycocystis beckeri (F.Muell.) Chinnock

Synonyms
- Disoon beckeri (F.Muell.) F.Muell.; Eremophila beckeri F.Muell.; Glycocystis beckeri Paczk. & A.R.Chapm. nom. inval.; Myoporum beckeri (F.Muell.) F.Muell. ex Benth.

= Glycocystis =

Genus of flowering plants

Glycocystis is a genus of flowering plants in the family Scrophulariaceae. It is monotypic, being represented by the single species Glycocystis beckeri which is endemic to the south west of Western Australia. It is a shrub, similar to others in the genera Eremophila and Myoporum but is unusual in that it produces very large amounts of sticky, sweet-smelling resin produced by raised glands which cover the entire plant, except for the petals. It has been suggested that the resin traps insects which the plant uses as a source of nitrogen.

== Description ==
Glycocystis beckeri is a compact, rounded shrub sometimes growing to a height of 3 metres (10 ft) with branches which have many raised glands producing large amounts of sticky, sweet smelling resin. The branches are often black due to the presence of fungus. The leaves are arranged alternately, mostly 12–22 millimetres (0.5–0.9 in) long, 3.5–6.5 millimetres (0.1–0.3 in) wide and lance-shaped with the narrower end towards the base. The edges of the leaves are serrated and their surface is covered with large numbers of small, raised resin glands.

The flowers are arranged singly or sometimes in pairs in the axils of leaves on a stalk 2–4 millimetres (0.08–0.2 in) long. There are 5 narrow, pointed sepals which have similar glands to the branches and leaves. There are also 5 petals joined at their bases, forming a bell-shaped tube. The petal tube is white apart from inside the tube and the lower lobe which are white with yellow blotches. The tube is 4–7 millimetres (0.2–0.3 in) long with lobes of slightly different lengths. There are 4 short stamens which extend slightly beyond the petal tube. Flowering occurs throughout the year, especially after rain and is followed by fruits which are dry and winged when mature.

== Taxonomy and naming ==
Glycocystis beckeri was first formally described in 1859 by Ferdinand von Mueller who gave it the name Eremophila beckeri in Fragmenta phytographiae Australiae from a specimen collected by George Maxwell in rocky hills near the Phillips River. The genus name (Glycocystis) is from the Ancient Greek words γλυκύς (glykýs) meaning "sweet" and κύστις (kýstis) meaning "a cyst" or "bladder" referring to the sweet smelling resin produced by the glands on many parts of this species. The specific epithet (beckeri) honours the artist, naturalist and explorer Ludwig Becker.

== Distribution and habitat ==
Glycocystis beckeri occurs near Ravensthorpe in the Esperance Plains and Mallee biogeographic regions. It grows in pebbly clay loam.

== Ecology ==
It has been suggested that the production of large amounts of sweet resin by this plant may be an adaptation to attract and trap insects which may in turn provide the plant with nitrogen in a similar way to that employed by plants in the South African genus Roridula.

== Conservation ==
Glycocystis beckeri is classified as "not threatened" by the Western Australian Government Department of Parks and Wildlife.
