= Dolichostemon =

Scientific classification
- Kingdom: Plantae
- Clade: Tracheophytes
- Clade: Angiosperms
- Clade: Eudicots
- Clade: Asterids
- Order: Lamiales
- Family: Scrophulariaceae
- Genus: Dolichostemon; Bonati (1923 publ. 1924)
- Species: D. verticillatus

Binomial name
- Dolichostemon verticillatus Bonati (1923 publ. 1924)

Species of flowering plants

Dolichostemon verticillatus is a species of flowering plant in the family Scrophulariaceae. It is the sole species in genus Dolichostemon. It is endemic to southern Vietnam.
