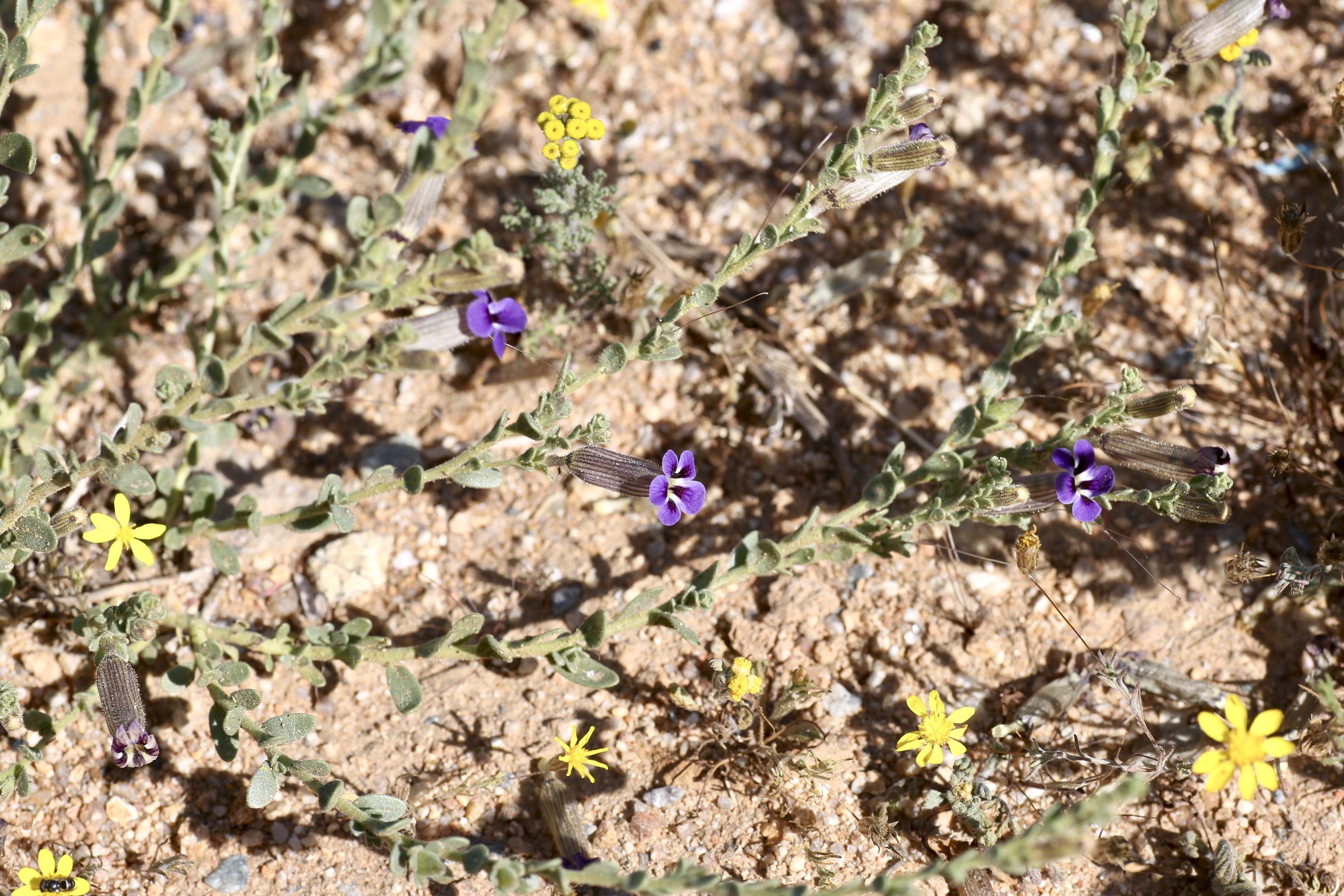
- P. virgatum near Springbok, Northern Cape

Scientific classification
- Kingdom: Plantae
- Clade: Tracheophytes
- Clade: Angiosperms
- Clade: Eudicots
- Clade: Asterids
- Order: Lamiales
- Family: Scrophulariaceae
- Genus: Peliostomum; E.Mey. ex Benth.

= Peliostomum =

Genus of plants

Peliostomum is a genus of flowering plants belonging to the family Scrophulariaceae.

Its native range is Southern Africa.

== Species ==
Species:

- Peliostomum calycinum N.E.Br.
- Peliostomum junceum (Hiern) Kolberg & van Slageren
- Peliostomum leucorrhizum E.Mey. ex Benth.
- Peliostomum origanoides E.Mey. ex Benth.
- Peliostomum virgatum E.Mey. ex Benth.
- Peliostomum viscosum E.Mey. ex Benth.
