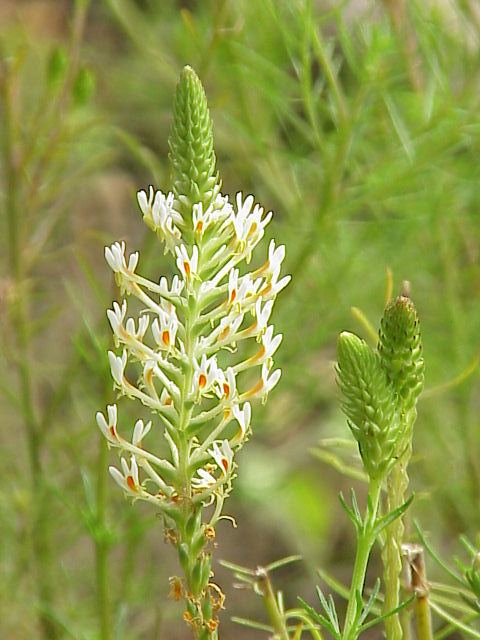
- Hebenstreitia dentata

Scientific classification
- Kingdom: Plantae
- Clade: Embryophytes
- Clade: Tracheophytes
- Clade: Angiosperms
- Clade: Eudicots
- Clade: Asterids
- Order: Lamiales
- Family: Scrophulariaceae
- Tribe: Limoselleae
- Genus: Hebenstretia; L.

Species
- See text

Synonyms
- Polycenia Choisy

= Hebenstretia =

Genus of flowering plants

Hebenstretia is a genus of flowering plants in the family Scrophulariaceae, native to Africa. They are annual or perennial herbs or shrubs, found in mesic habitats.

== Species ==
Currently accepted species include:

- Hebenstretia angolensis Rolfe
- Hebenstretia anomala Roessler
- Hebenstretia comosa Hochst.
- Hebenstretia cordata L.
- Hebenstretia dentata L.
- Hebenstretia dregei Rolfe
- Hebenstretia dura Choisy
- Hebenstretia fastigiosa Jaroscz
- Hebenstretia glaucescens Schltr.
- Hebenstretia hamulosa E.Mey.
- Hebenstretia holubii Rolfe
- Hebenstretia integrifolia L.
- Hebenstretia kamiesbergensis Roessler
- Hebenstretia lanceolata (E.Mey.) Rolfe
- Hebenstretia minutiflora Rolfe
- Hebenstretia namaquensis Roessler
- Hebenstretia neglecta Roessler
- Hebenstretia oatesii Rolfe
- Hebenstretia paarlensis Roessler
- Hebenstretia parviflora E.Mey.
- Hebenstretia ramosissima Jaroscz
- Hebenstretia rehmannii Rolfe
- Hebenstretia repens Jaroscz
- Hebenstretia robusta E.Mey.
- Hebenstretia sarcocarpa Bolus ex Rolfe
