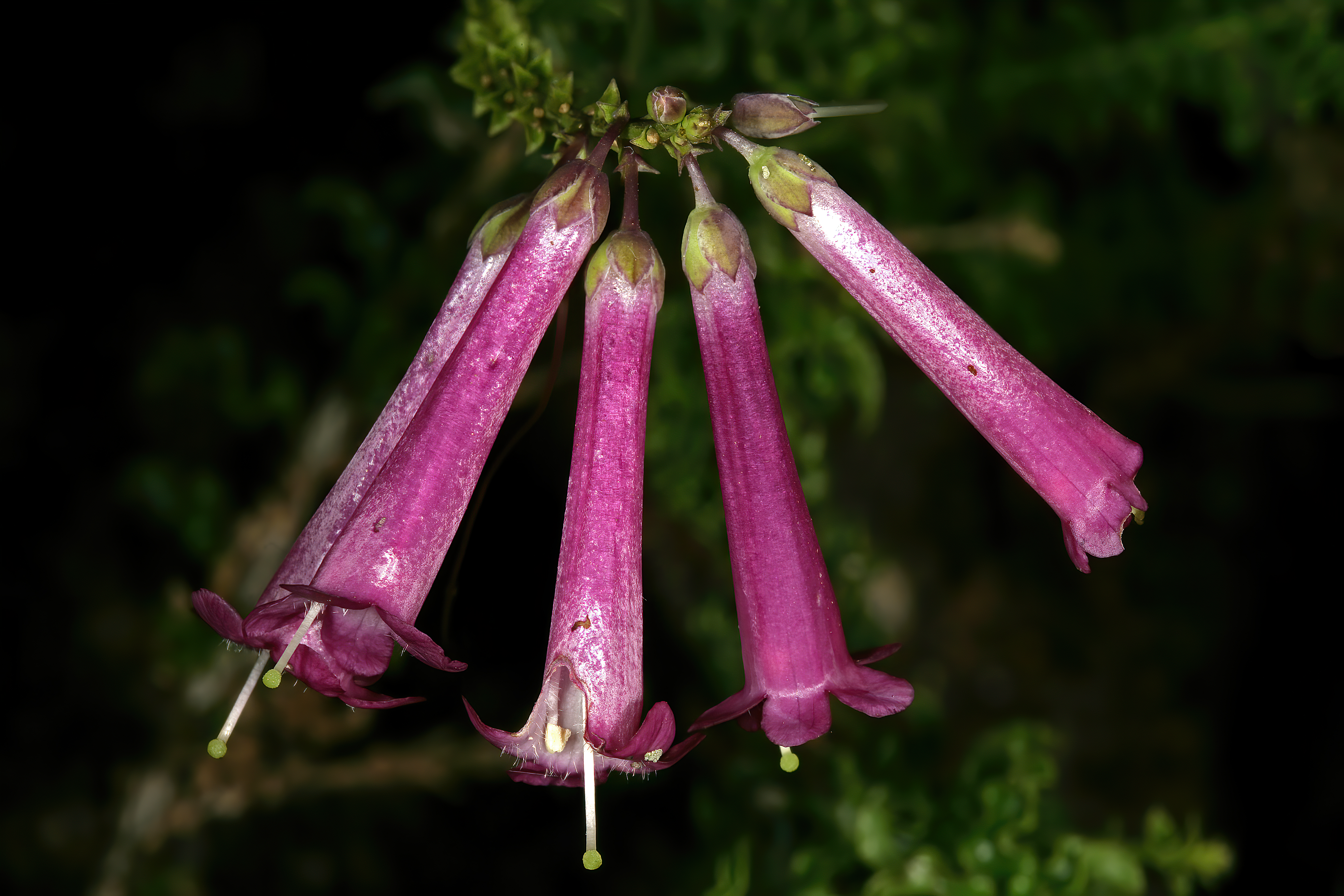

Scientific classification
- Kingdom: Plantae
- Clade: Tracheophytes
- Clade: Angiosperms
- Clade: Eudicots
- Clade: Asterids
- Order: Lamiales
- Family: Scrophulariaceae
- Genus: Freylinia
- Species: F. crispa

Binomial name
- Freylinia crispa van Jaarsv.

= Freylinia crispa =

Species of flowering plant

Freylinia crispa is a flowering plant in the figwort family.
