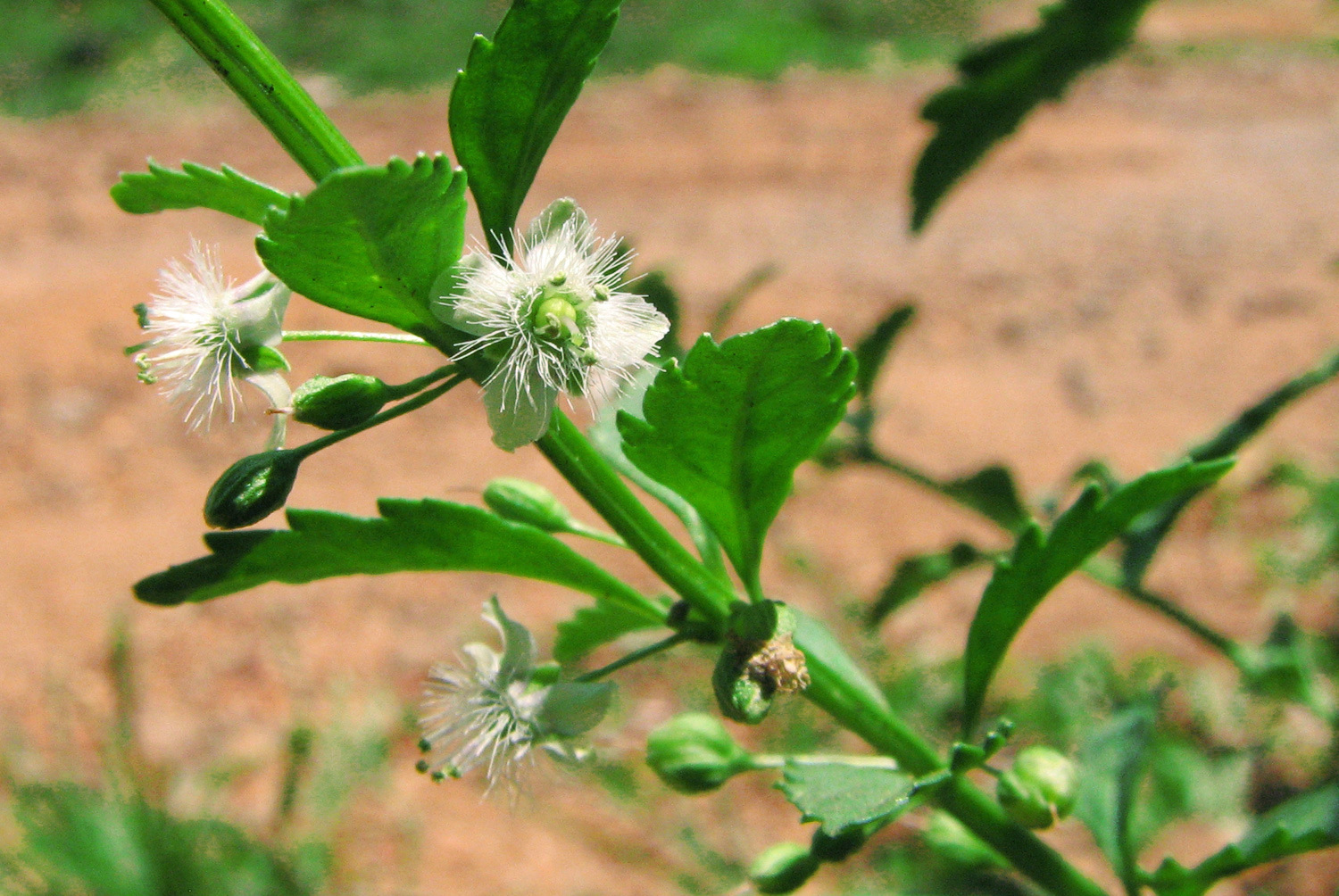

Conservation status
- Apparently Secure (NatureServe)

Scientific classification
- Kingdom: Plantae
- Clade: Tracheophytes
- Clade: Angiosperms
- Clade: Eudicots
- Clade: Asterids
- Order: Lamiales
- Family: Plantaginaceae
- Genus: Scoparia
- Species: S. dulcis

Binomial name
- Scoparia dulcis L.

Synonyms
- Ambulia micrantha Raf.; Capraria dulcis (L.) Kuntze; Gratiola micrantha Nutt.; Scoparia grandiflora Nash; Scoparia nudicaulis Chodat & Hassl.; Scoparia procumbens Jacq.; Scoparia purpurea Ridl.; Scoparia ternata Forssk.

= Scoparia dulcis =

Species of flowering plant

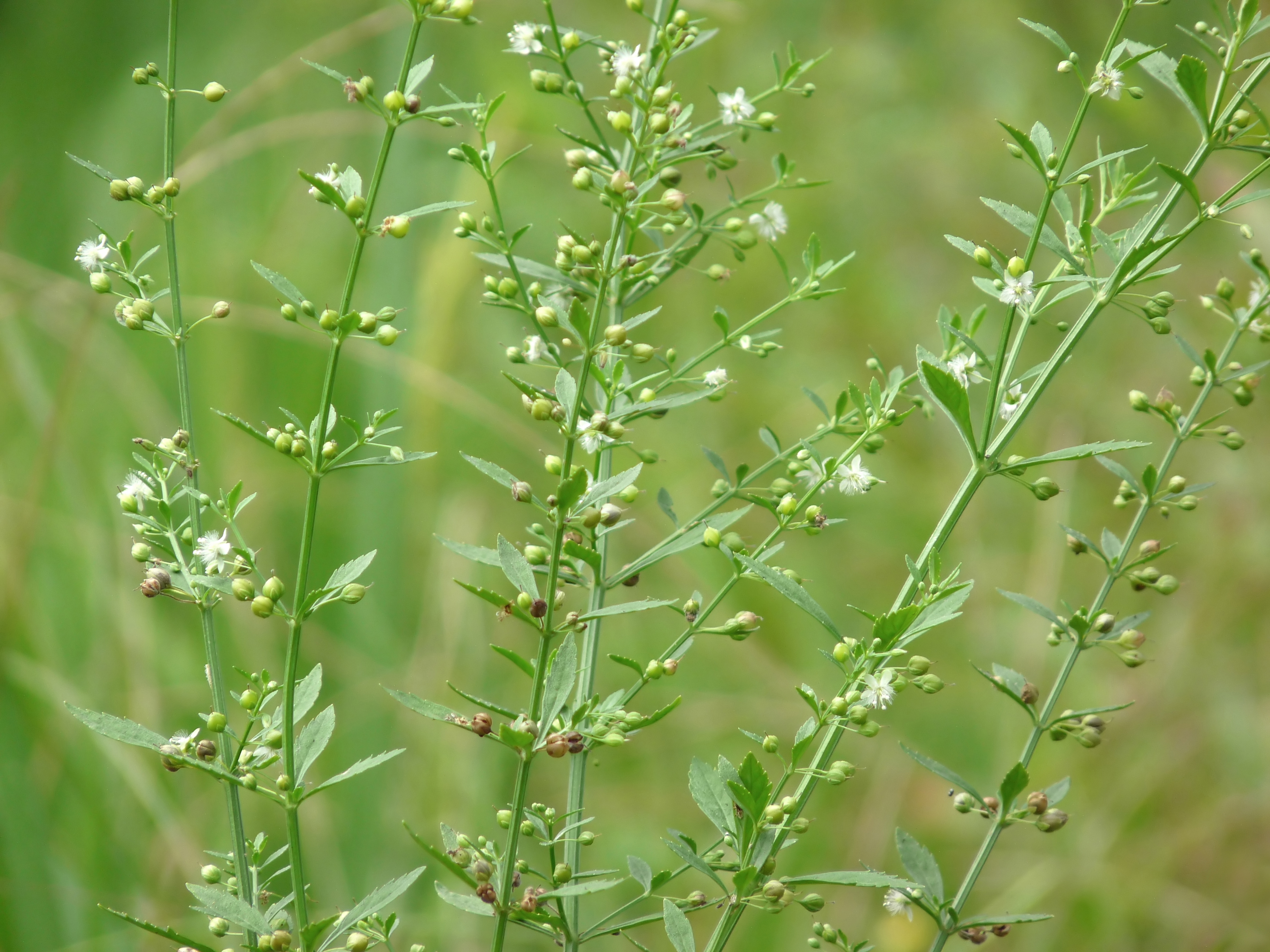

Scoparia dulcis is a species of flowering plant in the plantain family. Common names include licorice weed, goatweed, scoparia-weed and sweet-broom in English, tapeiçava, tapixaba, and vassourinha in Portuguese, escobillo in Spanish, and tipychä kuratu in Guarani. It is native to the Neotropics but it can be found throughout the tropical and subtropical world.

Although S. dulcis is considered a weed in many parts of India and Bangladesh, its use in traditional medicine has led to overexploitation. The plant is also found as a weed in American citrus groves.

== Description ==
S. dulcis may reach between 30 and 80 centimeters (approximately 12 to 31 inches) in height. Leaves are oppositely arranged and 1 to 3 centimeters long. Flowers are axillary.

== Traditional medicine ==
As a traditional medicine, S. dulcis has been used for diabetes in India and hypertension in Taiwan. In Siddha medicine it is used for treatment of kidney stones, but it needs rigorous diet method. It is called kallurukki (stone melter) in Malayalam and Tamil. In Brazil, it has been used for various problems such as hemorrhoids and wounds. S. dulcis was also used in traditional medicine in Trinidad, Puerto Rico, Colombia, Mexico, Venezuela, Guatemala, Surinam, Bolivia, Argentina, and El Salvador.

== Chemical constituents ==
Chemicals that have been isolated from S. dulcis include scoparinol and epinephrine.

== Gallery ==
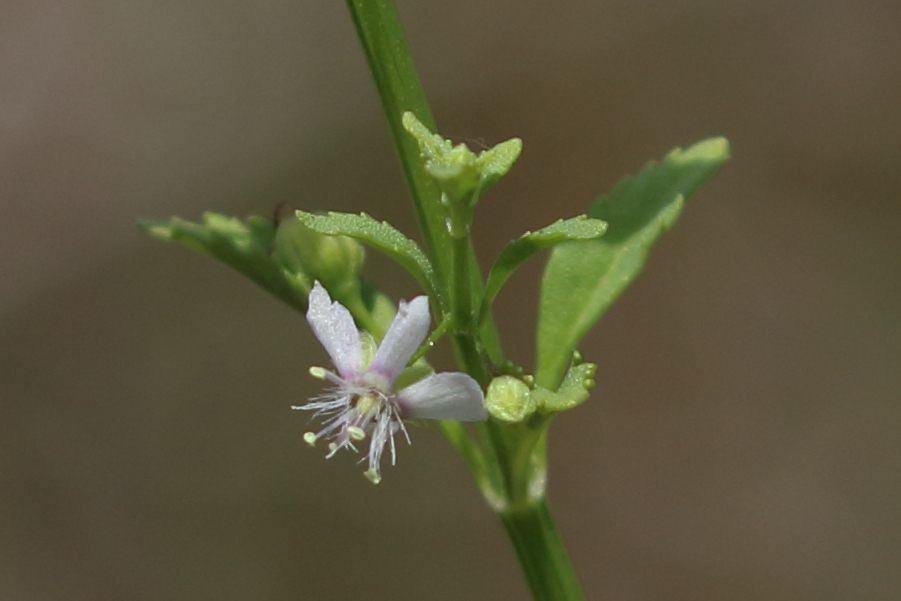
Flower of Scoparia dulcis

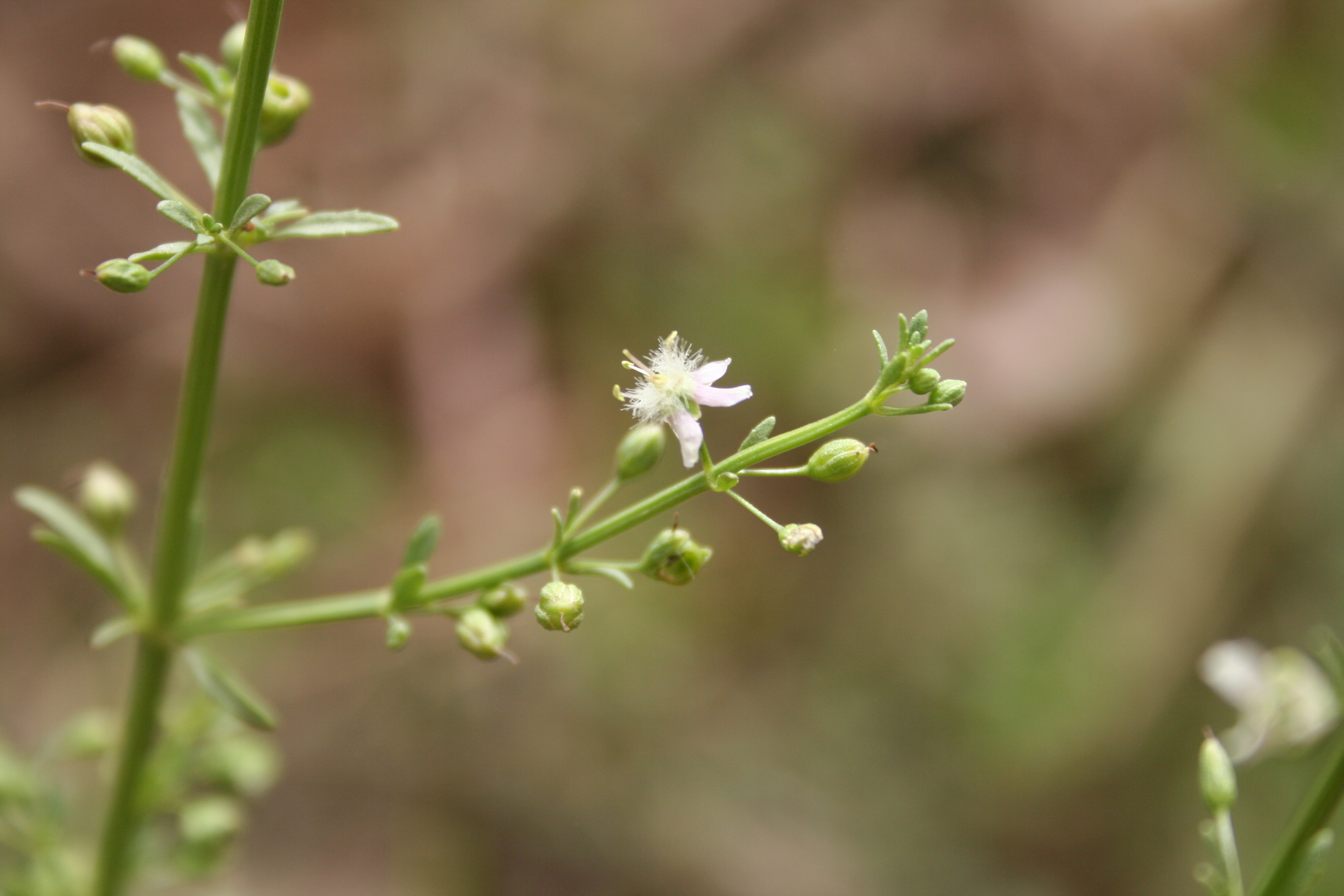
Scoparia dulcis, near F.Cl. de Patako, Senegal

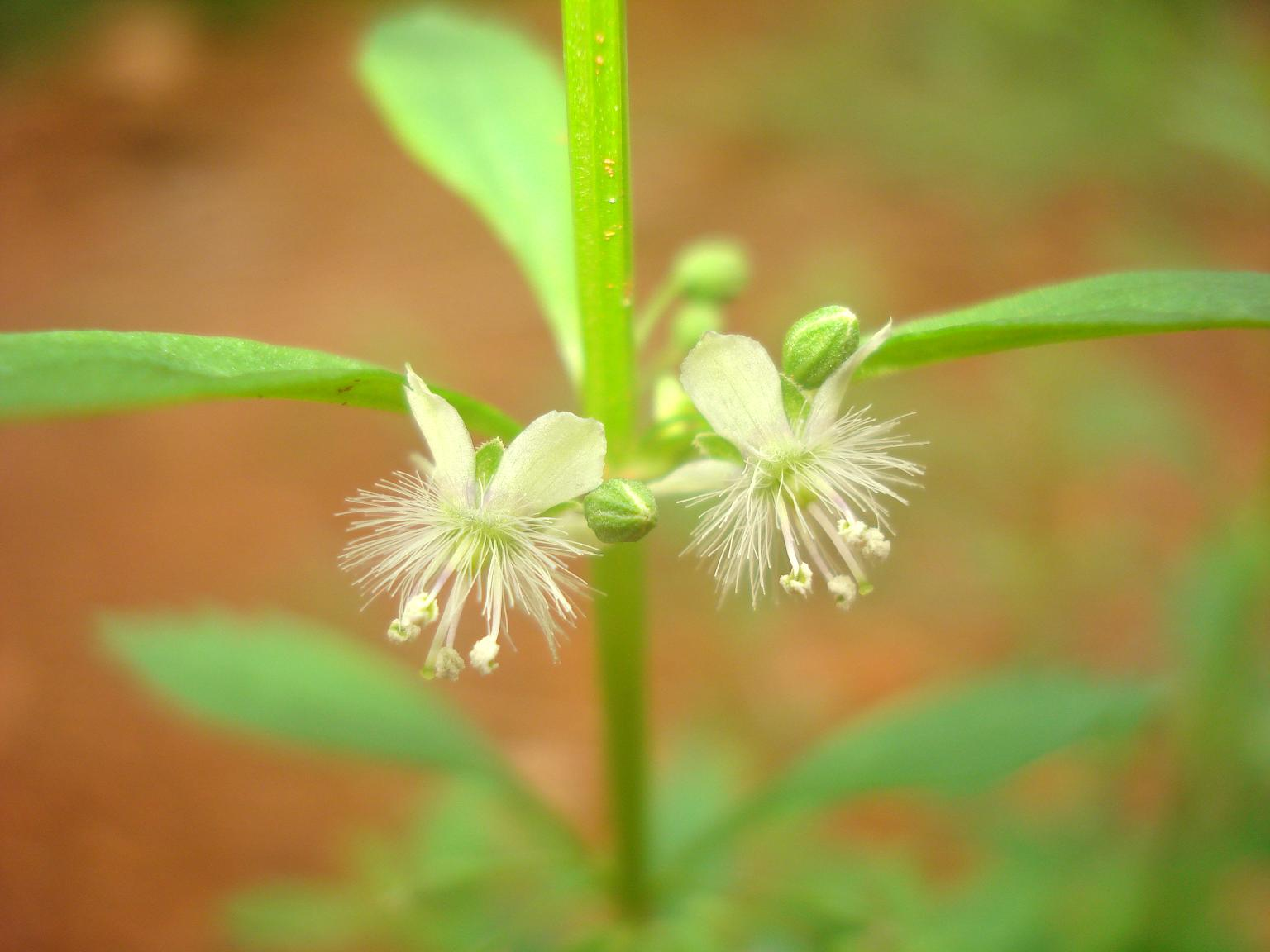
Flower of Scoparia dulcis

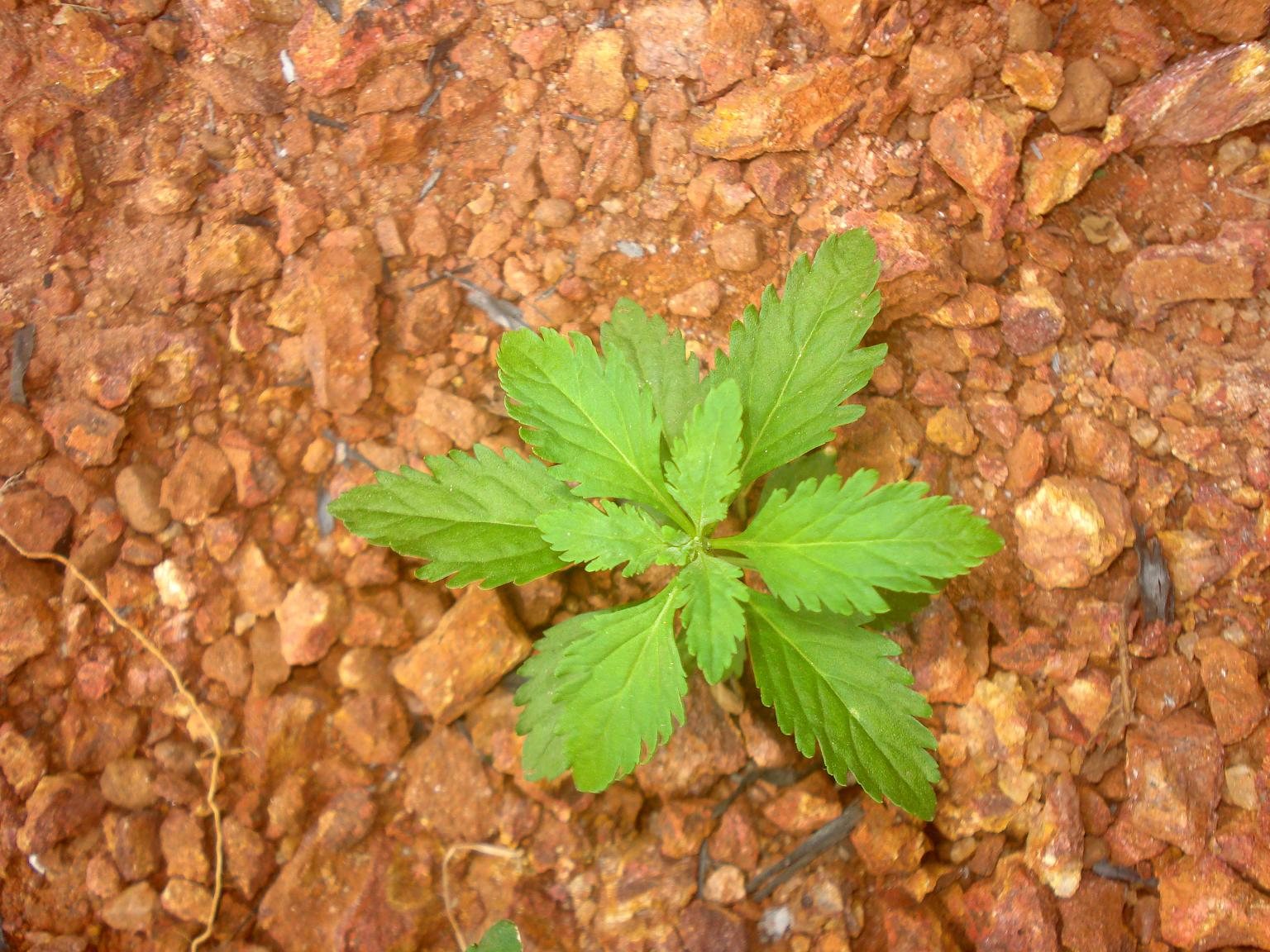
Scoparia dulcis

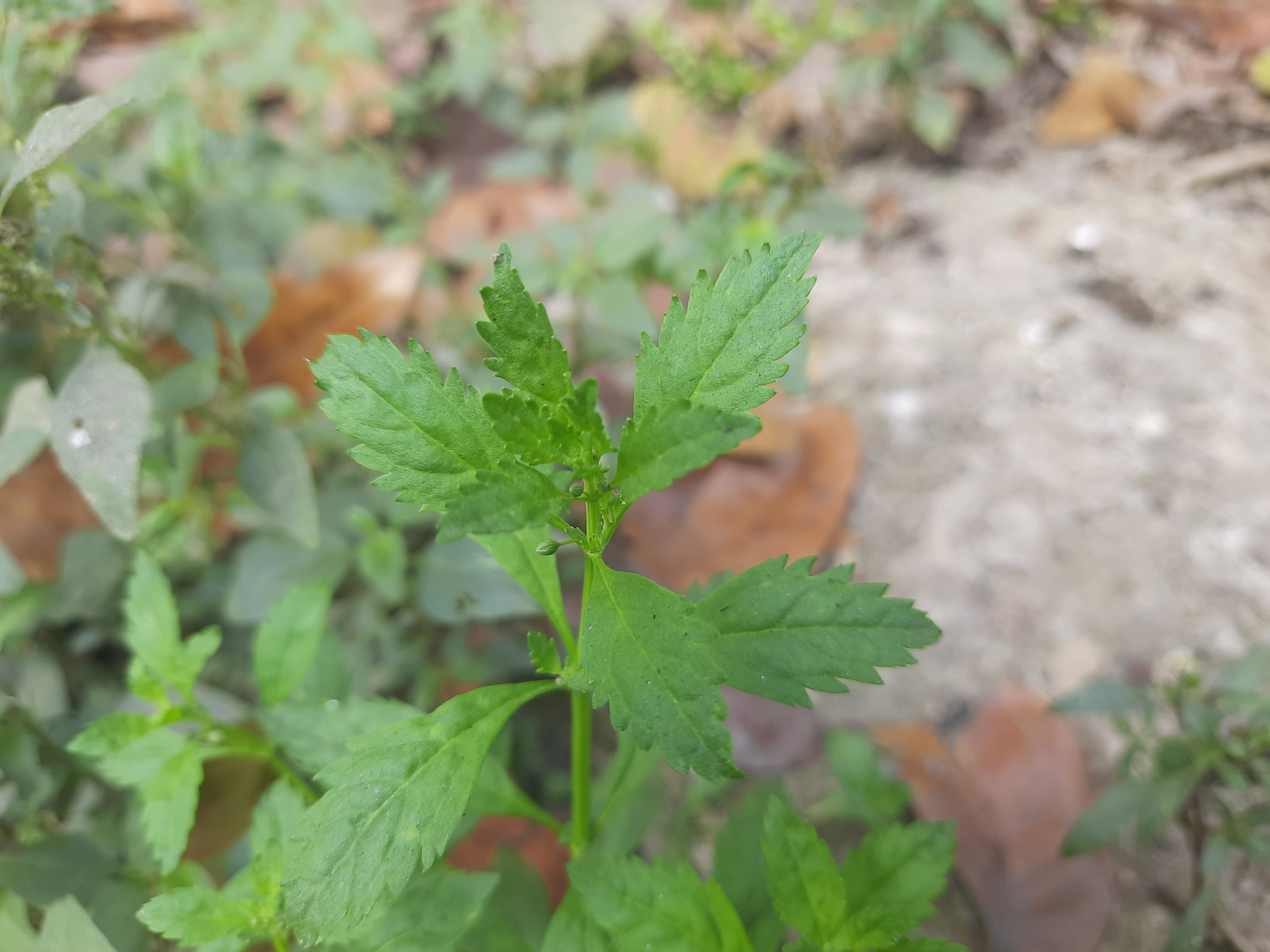
New leaves of Scoparia dulcis

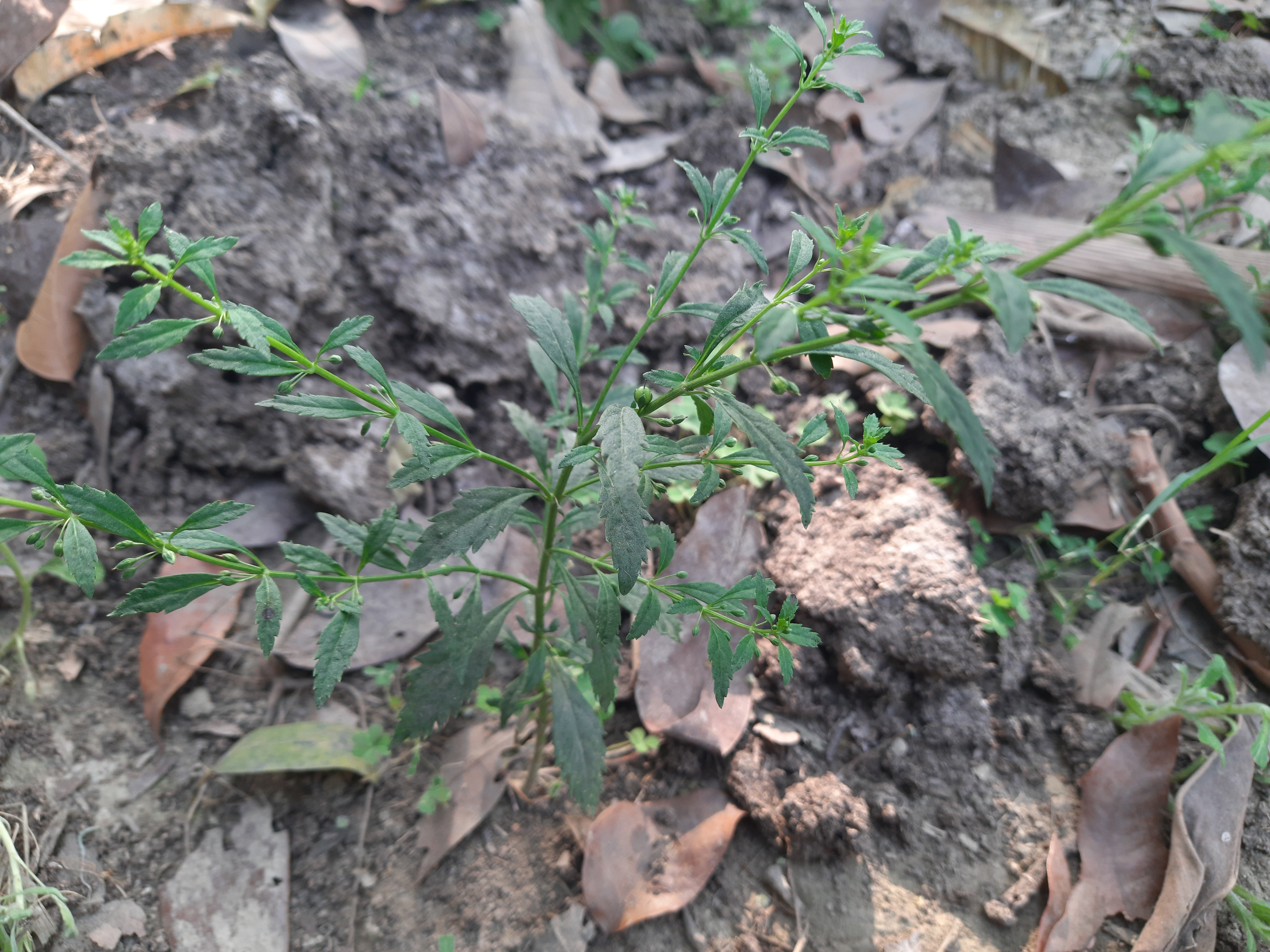
Scoparia dulcis plant
