= Rhabdotosperma =

Scientific classification
- Kingdom: Plantae
- Clade: Tracheophytes
- Clade: Angiosperms
- Clade: Eudicots
- Clade: Asterids
- Order: Lamiales
- Family: Scrophulariaceae
- Tribe: Scrophularieae
- Genus: Rhabdotosperma; Hartl

Genus of plants

Rhabdotosperma is a genus of flowering plants in the family Scrophulariaceae.

It contains the following species:

- Rhabdotosperma bottae (Deflers) Hartl
- Rhabdotosperma brevipedicellata (Engl.) Hartl
- Rhabdotosperma densifolia (Hook.f.) Hartl
- Rhabdotosperma ledermannii (Schltr. ex Murb.) Hartl
- Rhabdotosperma scrophulariifolia (Hochst. ex A.Rich.) Hartl
