= Ranopisoa =

Scientific classification
- Kingdom: Plantae
- Clade: Tracheophytes
- Clade: Angiosperms
- Clade: Eudicots
- Clade: Asterids
- Order: Lamiales
- Family: Scrophulariaceae
- Genus: Ranopisoa; J.-F.Leroy
- Species: R. rakotosonii

Binomial name
- Ranopisoa rakotosonii (Capuron) J.-F.Leroy

Genus of plants

Ranopisoa is a monotypic genus of flowering plants belonging to the family Scrophulariaceae. The only species is Ranopisoa rakotosonii.

Its native range is Madagascar.
