= Ross Hiern =

Australian cricketer

Personal information
- Born: 2 August 1922; Adelaide, Australia
- Died: 21 August 1999 (aged 77); Morphettville, South Australia
- Source: Cricinfo, 6 August 2020

Ross Hiern (2 August 1922 – 21 August 1999) was an Australian cricketer. He played in twelve first-class matches for South Australia between 1949 and 1954.

== See also ==
- List of South Australian representative cricketers
