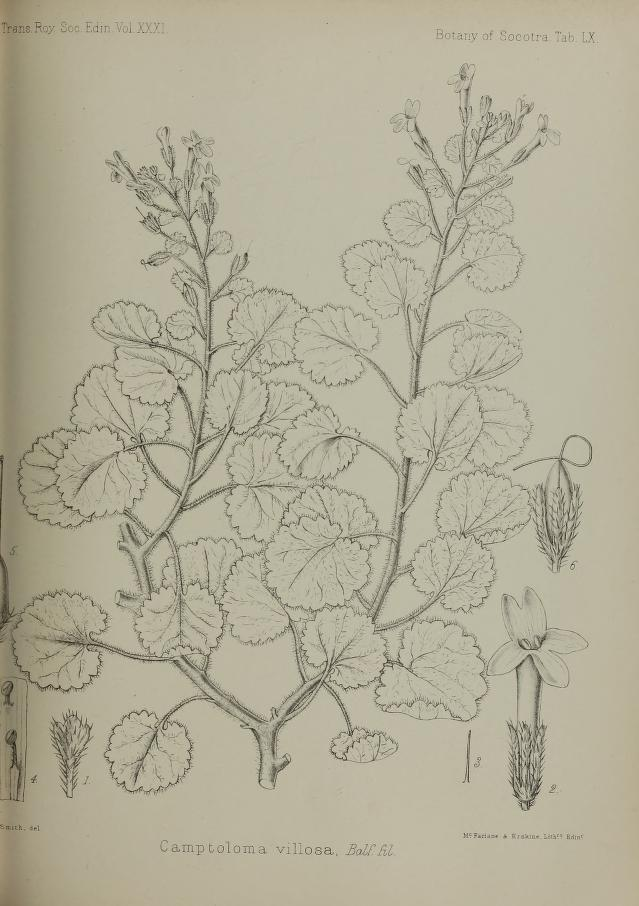
- Camptoloma lyperiiflorum

Scientific classification
- Kingdom: Plantae
- Clade: Tracheophytes
- Clade: Angiosperms
- Clade: Eudicots
- Clade: Asterids
- Order: Lamiales
- Family: Scrophulariaceae
- Tribe: Limoselleae
- Genus: Camptoloma; Benth. (1846)

Species
- Camptoloma canariense (Webb & Berthel.) Hilliard; Camptoloma lyperiiflorum (Vatke) Hilliard; Camptoloma rotundifolium Benth.

Synonyms
- Urbania Vatke (1875)

= Camptoloma (plant) =

Genus of flowering plants

Camptoloma is a genus of flowering plants in the family Scrophulariaceae. It includes four species of annuals, subshrubs, and shrubs native to the Canary Islands, Somalia and the southern Arabian Peninsula, and Angola and Namibia.

- Camptoloma canariense (Webb & Berthel.) Hilliard – Gran Canaria, Canary Islands
- Camptoloma lyperiiflorum (Vatke) Hilliard – northern Somalia, Socotra, Yemen, and Oman
- Camptoloma rotundifolium Benth. – Namibia and southwestern Angola
