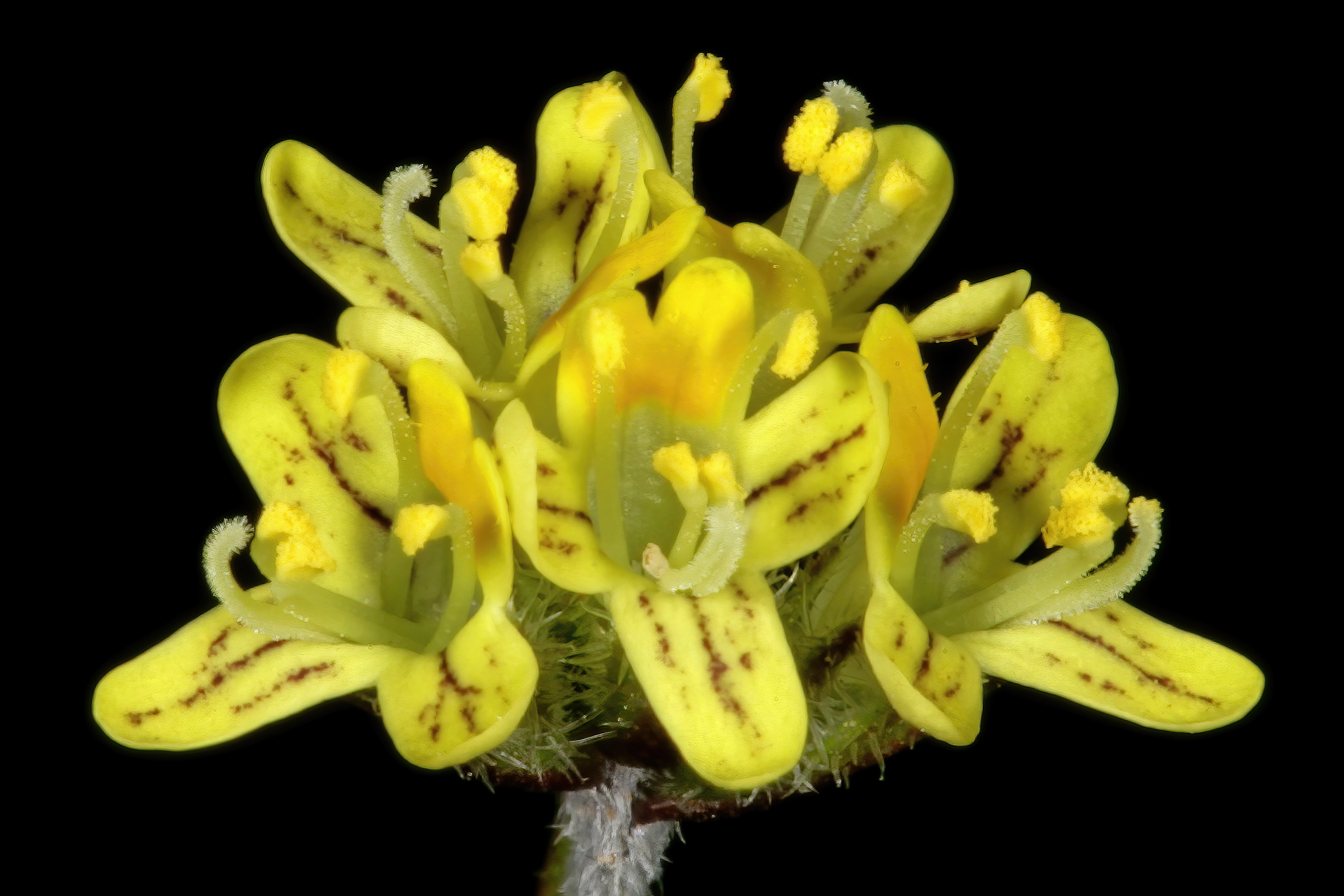
- Phyllopodium heterophyllum

Scientific classification
- Kingdom: Plantae
- Clade: Tracheophytes
- Clade: Angiosperms
- Clade: Eudicots
- Clade: Asterids
- Order: Lamiales
- Family: Scrophulariaceae
- Genus: Phyllopodium; Benth.

= Phyllopodium (plant) =

Genus of plants

Phyllopodium is a genus of flowering plants belonging to the family Scrophulariaceae.

Its native range is Southern Africa.

== Species ==
Species:

- Phyllopodium alpinum N.E.Br.
- Phyllopodium anomalum Hilliard
- Phyllopodium bracteatum Benth.
- Phyllopodium caespitosum Hilliard
- Phyllopodium capillare (L.f.) Hilliard
- Phyllopodium cephalophorum (Thunb.) Hilliard
- Phyllopodium collinum (Hiern) Hilliard
- Phyllopodium cordatum (Thunb.) Hilliard
- Phyllopodium cuneifolium (L.f.) Benth.
- Phyllopodium diffusum Benth.
- Phyllopodium dolomiticum Hilliard
- Phyllopodium elegans (Choisy) Hilliard
- Phyllopodium heterophyllum (L.f.) Benth.
- Phyllopodium hispidulum (Thell.) Hilliard
- Phyllopodium lupuliforme (Thell.) Hilliard
- Phyllopodium maxii (Hiern) Hilliard
- Phyllopodium micranthum (Schltr.) Hilliard
- Phyllopodium mimetes Hilliard
- Phyllopodium multifolium Hiern
- Phyllopodium namaense (Thell.) Hilliard
- Phyllopodium phyllopodioides (Schltr.) Hilliard
- Phyllopodium pubiflorum Hilliard
- Phyllopodium pumilum Benth.
- Phyllopodium rustii (Rolfe) Hilliard
- Phyllopodium tweedense Hilliard
- Phyllopodium viscidissimum Hilliard
