= Eremogeton =

Scientific classification
- Kingdom: Plantae
- Clade: Tracheophytes
- Clade: Angiosperms
- Clade: Eudicots
- Clade: Asterids
- Order: Lamiales
- Family: Scrophulariaceae
- Genus: Eremogeton; Standl. & L.O.Williams
- Species: E. grandiflorus

Binomial name
- Eremogeton grandiflorus (A.Gray) Standl. & L.O.Williams

Synonyms
- Ghiesbreghtia A.Gray, nom. illeg.; Ghiesbreghtia grandiflora A.Gray

Genus of plants

Eremogeton is a monotypic genus of flowering plants belonging to the family Scrophulariaceae. The only species is Eremogeton grandiflorus. It is a shrub or tree native to southeastern Mexico (Chiapas) and Guatemala.
