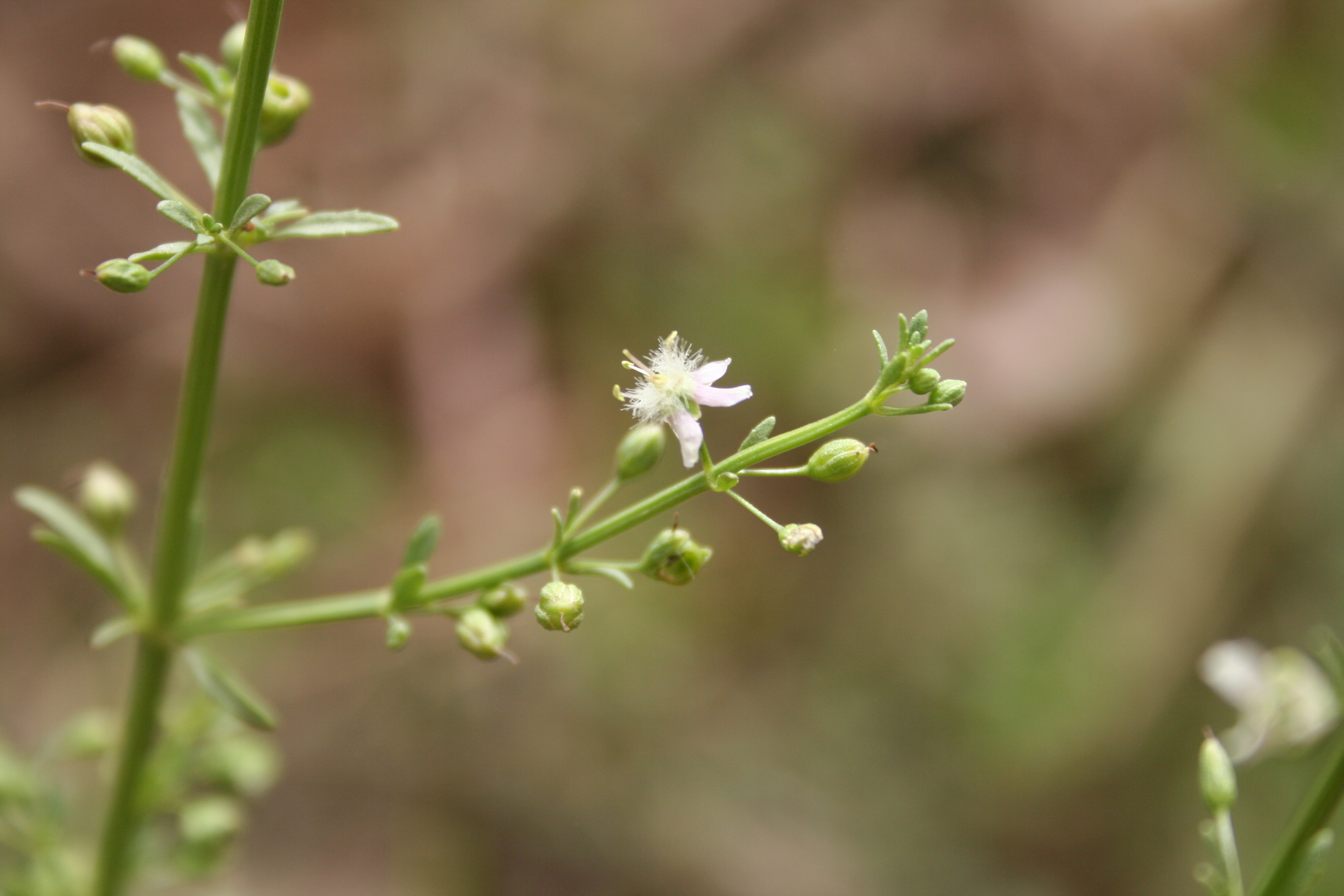
- Scoparia dulcis

Scientific classification
- Kingdom: Plantae
- Clade: Tracheophytes
- Clade: Angiosperms
- Clade: Eudicots
- Clade: Asterids
- Order: Lamiales
- Family: Plantaginaceae
- Tribe: Gratioleae
- Genus: Scoparia; L.

Synonyms
- Kreidek Adans.; Serruria hirsuta H.Buek ex Meisn.

= Scoparia (plant) =

Genus of plants

Scoparia is a genus of mostly tropical plants including Scoparia dulcis known as broom-weed, sweet broom-weed, and licorice weed.

== Species ==
The following species are recognised in the genus Scoparia:

- Scoparia aemilii Chodat
- Scoparia dulcis L.
- Scoparia elliptica Cham.
- Scoparia ericacea Cham. & Schltdl.
- Scoparia hassleriana Chodat
- Scoparia mexicana R.E.Fr.
- Scoparia montevidensis (Spreng.) R.E.Fr.
- Scoparia nudicaulis Chodat & Hassl.
- Scoparia pentapetala Deble & B.P.Moreira
- Scoparia pinnatifida Cham.
- Scoparia plebeia Cham. & Schltdl.
