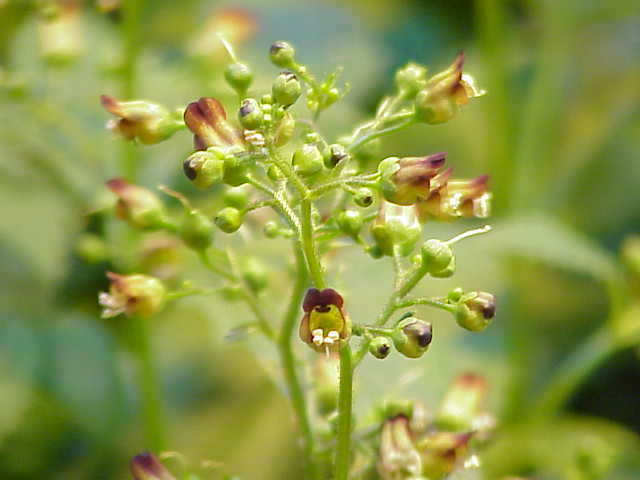
- Scrophularia nodosa

Scientific classification
- Kingdom: Plantae
- Clade: Tracheophytes
- Clade: Angiosperms
- Clade: Eudicots
- Clade: Asterids
- Order: Lamiales
- Family: Scrophulariaceae; Juss.

Genera
- See text

Synonyms
- Bontiaceae Horan.; Buddlejaceae K.Wilh., nom. cons.; Hebenstretiaceae Horan.; Limosellaceae J.Agardh; Myoporaceae R.Br., nom. cons.; Oftiaceae Takht. & Reveal; Selaginaceae Choisy, nom. cons.; Spielmanniaceae J.Agardh, nom. illeg.; Verbascaceae Bercht. & J.Presl

= Scrophulariaceae =

Figwort family

Figwort family of flowering plants

The Scrophulariaceae are a family of flowering plants, commonly known as the figwort family. The plants are annual and perennial herbs, as well as shrubs. Flowers have bilateral (zygomorphic) or rarely radial (actinomorphic) symmetry. The Scrophulariaceae have a cosmopolitan distribution, with the majority found in temperate areas, including tropical mountains. The family name is based on the name of the included genus Scrophularia L.

== Taxonomy ==
In the past, it was treated as including about 275 genera and over 5,000 species, but its circumscription has been radically altered since numerous molecular phylogenies have shown the traditional broad circumscription to be grossly polyphyletic. Many genera have recently been transferred to other families within the Lamiales, notably Plantaginaceae and Orobanchaceae, but also several new families. Several families of the Lamiales have had their circumscriptions enlarged to accommodate genera transferred from the Scrophulariacae sensu lato.

Fischer (2004) considered the family to consist of three subfamilies – Antirrhinoideae, Gratioloideae, and Digitalidoideae. He further divided the Gratioloideae into five tribes – Gratioleae, Angeloniaeae, Stemodieae, Limoselleae, and Lindernieae. He then divided the Gratioleae, with its 16 genera (and about 182 species) into three subtribes – Caprarinae, Dopatrinae, and Gratiolinae. The Gratiolinae had 10 genera (about 121 species) distributed through temperate and tropical America – Bacopa and Mecardonia (formerly Herpestis), Amphianthus, Gratiola, Sophronanthe, Benjaminia, Scoparia, Boelkea, Maeviella, and Braunblequetia. Many of these were transferred to the family Plantaginaceae, in the tribe Gratioleae.

== Uses ==
The family includes some medicinal plants, among them:

- Scrophularia, figworts
- Verbascum, mulleins

== Genera ==
The family Scrophulariaceae in its APG IV (2016) circumscription includes 62 genera and about 1830 known species. As of May 2024, Plants of the World Online accepts 58 genera.

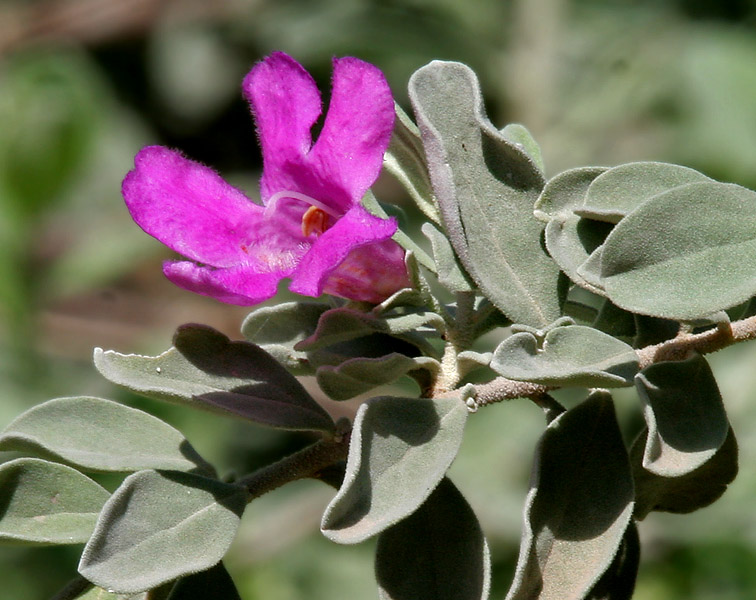
Leucophyllum frutescens

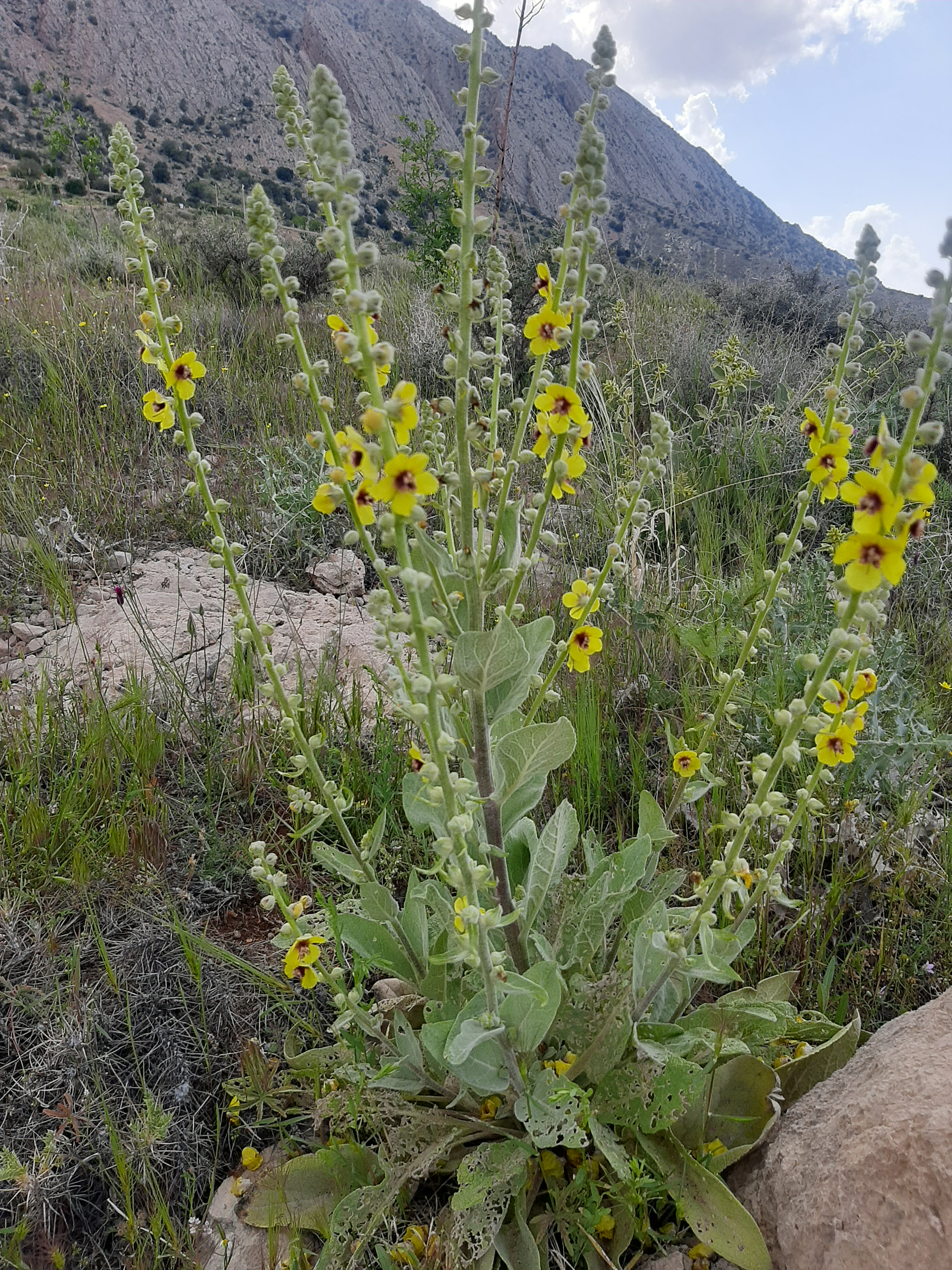
Verbascum sp. near Shiraz, Iran

Tribe Androyeae

- Androya H.Perrier

Tribe Aptosimeae

- Anticharis Endl.
- Aptosimum Burch. ex Benth.
- Peliostomum E.Mey. ex Benth.

Tribe Buddlejeae

- Buddleja L. – Butterfly-bush
- Gomphostigma Turcz.

Tribe Camptolomeae

- Camptoloma Benth.

Tribe Hemimerideae

- Alonsoa Ruiz & Pav.
- Colpias E.Mey. ex Benth.
- Diascia Link & Otto
- Diclis Benth.
- Hemimeris L.f.
- Nemesia Vent.

Tribe Leucophylleae

- Capraria L.
- Eremogeton Standl. & L.O.Williams
- Leucophyllum Humb. & Bonpl.

Tribe Limoselleae

- Barthlottia Eb.Fisch.
- Chaenostoma Benth. (sometimes included in Sutera but separated by Kornhall and Bremer)
- Chenopodiopsis Hilliard
- Cromidon Compton
- Dischisma Choisy
- Glekia Hilliard
- Globulariopsis Compton
- Glumicalyx Hiern
- Gosela Choisy
- Hebenstretia L
- Jamesbrittenia Kuntze
- Limosella L.
- Lyperia Benth.
- Manulea L.
- Manuleopsis Thell. ex Schinz
- Melanospermum Hilliard
- Microdon Choisy
- Phyllopodium Benth.
- Polycarena Benth.
- Selago L.
- Strobilopsis Hilliard & B.L.Burtt
- Sutera Roth – Dwarf snapdragon, "bacopa"
- Tetraselago Junell
- Trieenea Hilliard
- Zaluzianskya F.W.Schmidt

Tribe Myoporeae

- Bontia L.
- Calamphoreus Chinnock (synonym of Eremophila)
- Diocirea Chinnock (synonym of Eremophila)
- Eremophila R.Br.
- Glycocystis Chinnock
- Myoporum Sol. ex G.Forst.

Tribe Scrophularieae

- Antherothamnus N.E.Br.
- Nathaliella B.Fedtsch.
- Rhabdotosperma Hartl (synonym of Verbascum)
- × Scrophulari-verbascum P.Fourn.
- Scrophularia L. – Figwort
- Verbascum L. – Mullein

Tribe Teedieae

- Dermatobotrys Bolus
- Freylinia Colla
- Oftia Adans.
- Phygelius E.Mey. ex Benth. – Cape fuchsia
- Ranopisoa J.F.Leroy
- Teedia Rudolphi

Not placed in a tribe or unknown tribe

- Ameroglossum Eb.Fisch., S.Vogel & A.V.Lopes
- Chamaecrypta Schltr. & Diels
- Dolichostemon Bonati

=== Excluded genera ===
The following genera, traditionally included in the Scrophulariaceae, have been transferred to other families as indicated:

- Acanthorrhinum Rothm. → Plantaginaceae
- Agalinis Raf. → Orobanchaceae
- Angelonia Humb. & Bonpl. → Plantaginaceae
- Antirrhinum L. → Plantaginaceae
- Asarina Mill. → Plantaginaceae
- Bacopa Aubl. → Plantaginaceae
- Bartsia L. → Orobanchaceae
- Basistemon Turcz. → Plantaginaceae
- Besseya Rydb. → Plantaginaceae
- Calceolaria L. → Calceolariaceae
- Castilleja Mutis ex L.f. → Orobanchaceae
- Chaenorhinum (DC.) Rchb. → Plantaginaceae
- Chelone L. → Plantaginaceae
- Chionophila Benth. → Plantaginaceae
- Collinsia Nutt. → Plantaginaceae
- Cordylanthus Nutt. ex Benth. → Orobanchaceae
- Craterostigma Hochst. → Linderniaceae or as part of Lindernia
- Cymbalaria → Plantaginaceae
- Dasistoma Raf. → Orobanchaceae
- Digitalis L. → Plantaginaceae
- Dopatrium Buch.-Ham. ex Benth. → Plantaginaceae
- Epixiphium (Engelm. ex A.Gray) Munz → Plantaginaceae
- Euphrasia L. → Orobanchaceae
- Galvezia Dombey ex Juss. → Plantaginaceae
- Gambelia Nutt. → Plantaginaceae
- Glossostigma Wight & Arn. → Phrymaceae
- Gratiola L. → Plantaginaceae
- Hebe Comm. ex Juss. → Plantaginaceae
- Holmgrenanthe Elisens → Plantaginaceae
- Howelliella Rothm. → Plantaginaceae
- Keckiella Straw → Plantaginaceae
- Kickxia Dumort. → Plantaginaceae
- Lagotis Gaertn. → Plantaginaceae
- Leucosalpa Scott Elliot → Orobranchaceae
- Limnophila R.Br. → Plantaginaceae
- Linaria Mill. → Plantaginaceae
- Lindernia All. → Linderniaceae
- Lophospermum D.Don → Plantaginaceae
- Mabrya Elisens → Plantaginaceae
- Maurandella (A.Gray) Rothm. → Plantaginaceae
- Maurandya Ortega → Plantaginaceae
- Mazus Lour. → Mazaceae
- Mecardonia Ruiz & Pav. → Plantaginaceae
- Melampyrum L. → Orobanchaceae
- Micranthemum Michx. → Plantaginaceae
- Mimulus L. → Phrymaceae
- Misopates Raf. → Plantaginaceae
- Mohavea A.Gray → Plantaginaceae
- Neogaerrhinum Rothm. → Plantaginaceae
- Nothochelone (A.Gray) Straw → Plantaginaceae
- Nuttallanthus D.A.Sutton → Plantaginaceae
- Odontites Ludw. → Orobanchaceae
- Orobanche L. → Orobanchaceae
- Orthocarpus Nutt. → Orobanchaceae
- Parentucellia Viv. → Orobanchaceae
- Paulownia Siebold & Zucc. → Paulowniaceae
- Pedicularis L. → Orobanchaceae
- Peltanthera Benth. → Gesneriaceae (or Peltantheraceae)
- Penstemon Schmidel → Plantaginaceae
- Pseudorontium (A.Gray) Rothm. → Plantaginaceae
- Rhinanthus L. → Orobanchaceae
- Russelia Jacq. → Plantaginaceae
- Sairocarpus D.A.Sutton → Plantaginaceae
- Sanango G.S.Bunting & Duke → Gesneriaceae
- Schistophragma Benth. ex Endl. → Plantaginaceae
- Scoparia L. → Plantaginaceae
- Stemodia L. → Plantaginaceae
- Striga Lour. → Orobanchaceae
- Synthyris Benth. → Plantaginaceae
- Tonella Nutt. ex A.Gray → Plantaginaceae
- Torenia L. → Linderniaceae
- Tozzia L. → Orobanchaceae
- Triphysaria Fisch. & C.A.Mey. → Orobanchaceae
- Veronica L. → Plantaginaceae
- Veronicastrum Heist. ex Fabr. → Plantaginaceae
