= List of Scrophulariaceae of South Africa =

List of flowering plants recorded from South Africa

Scrophulariaceae is a family of flowering plants (anthophytes) in the order Lamiales, commonly known as the figwort family. The plants are annual and perennial herbs, as well as one genus of shrubs. Flowers have bilateral (zygomorphic) or rarely radial (actinomorphic) symmetry. The Scrophulariaceae have a cosmopolitan distribution, with the majority found in temperate areas, including tropical mountains. The family name is based on the name of the included genus Scrophularia L.

23,420 species of vascular plant have been recorded in South Africa, making it the sixth most species-rich country in the world and the most species-rich country on the African continent. Of these, 153 species are considered to be threatened. Nine biomes have been described in South Africa: Fynbos, Succulent Karoo, desert, Nama Karoo, grassland, savanna, Albany thickets, the Indian Ocean coastal belt, and forests.

The 2018 South African National Biodiversity Institute's National Biodiversity Assessment plant checklist lists 35,130 taxa in the phyla Anthocerotophyta (hornworts (6)), Anthophyta (flowering plants (33534)), Bryophyta (mosses (685)), Cycadophyta (cycads (42)), Lycopodiophyta (Lycophytes(45)), Marchantiophyta (liverworts (376)), Pinophyta (conifers (33)), and Pteridophyta (cryptogams (408)).

65 genera are represented in the literature. Listed taxa include species, subspecies, varieties, and forms as recorded, some of which have subsequently been allocated to other taxa as synonyms, in which cases the accepted taxon is appended to the listing. Multiple entries under alternative names reflect taxonomic revision over time.

== Agathelpis ==
Genus Agathelpis:

- Agathelpis dubia (L.) Hutch. ex Wijnands, accepted as Microdon dubius (L.) Hilliard, present
- Agathelpis nitida E.Mey. accepted as Microdon nitidus (E.Mey.) Hilliard, present

== Alonsoa ==
Genus Alonsoa:

- Alonsoa peduncularis (Kunze) Wettst. endemic
- Alonsoa unilabiata (L.f.) Steud. endemic

== Antherothamnus ==
Genus Antherothamnus:

- Antherothamnus pearsonii N.E.Br. indigenous

== Anticharis ==
Genus Anticharis:

- Anticharis linearis (Benth.) Hochst. ex Asch. accepted as Anticharis senegalensis (Walp.) Bhandari, present
- Anticharis scoparia (E.Mey. ex Benth.) Hiern ex Benth. & Hook.f. indigenous
- Anticharis senegalensis (Walp.) Bhandari, indigenous

== Aptosimum ==
Genus Aptosimum:

- Aptosimum albomarginatum Marloth & Engl. indigenous
- Aptosimum elongatum Engl. indigenous
- Aptosimum indivisum Burch. ex Benth. indigenous
- Aptosimum junceum (Hiern) Philcox, accepted as Peliostomum junceum (Hiern) Kolberg & Van Slageren, indigenous
- Aptosimum leucorrhizum (E.Mey. ex Benth.) E.Phillips, accepted as Peliostomum leucorrhizum E.Mey. ex Benth. indigenous
- Aptosimum lineare Marloth & Engl. indigenous
- Aptosimum lugardiae (N.E.Br. ex Hemsl. & Skan) E.Phillips, accepted as Peliostomum leucorrhizum E.Mey. ex Benth. indigenous
- Aptosimum marlothii (Engl.) Hiern, indigenous
- Aptosimum neglectum Emil Weber, indigenous
- Aptosimum patulum Bremek. endemic
- Aptosimum procumbens (Lehm.) Steud. indigenous
- Aptosimum spinescens (Thunb.) Emil Weber, indigenous
- Aptosimum tragacanthoides E.Mey. ex Benth. indigenous
- Aptosimum transvaalense Emil Weber, endemic
- Aptosimum viscosum Benth. indigenous

== Buddleja ==
Genus Buddleja:

- Buddleja auriculata Benth. indigenous
- Buddleja davidii Franch. not indigenous, naturalised, invasive
- Buddleja dysophylla (Benth.) Radlk. indigenous
- Buddleja glomerata H.L.Wendl. endemic
- Buddleja loricata Leeuwenb. indigenous
- Buddleja madagascariensis Lam. not indigenous, naturalised, invasive
- Buddleja pulchella N.E.Br. indigenous
- Buddleja saligna Willd. indigenous
- Buddleja salviifolia (L.) Lam. indigenous

== Capraria ==
Genus Capraria:

- Capraria salicifolia Hort. ex Benth., accepted as Freylinia lanceolata (L.f.) G.Don, present

== Chaenostoma ==
Genus Chaenostoma:

- Chaenostoma aethiopicum (L.) Benth. endemic
- Chaenostoma affine Bernh. endemic
- Chaenostoma archeri (Compton) Kornhall, endemic
- Chaenostoma caeruleum (L.f.) Kornhall, endemic
- Chaenostoma calciphilum (Hilliard) Kornhall, endemic
- Chaenostoma calycinum Benth. endemic
- Chaenostoma campanulatum Benth. endemic
- Chaenostoma cinereum (Hilliard) Kornhall, endemic
- Chaenostoma comptonii (Hilliard) Kornhall, endemic
- Chaenostoma cordatum (Thunb.) Benth. endemic
- Chaenostoma cuneatum Benth., accepted as Chaenostoma hispidum (Thunb.) Benth.
- Chaenostoma debile (Hutch.) Kornhall, indigenous
- Chaenostoma decipiens (Hilliard) Kornhall, endemic
- Chaenostoma denudatum Benth. endemic
- Chaenostoma fastigiatum Benth. accepted as Chaenostoma aethiopicum (L.) Benth.
  - Chaenostoma fastigiatum Benth. var. glabratum Benth. accepted as Chaenostoma aethiopicum (L.) Benth.
- Chaenostoma floribundum Benth. indigenous
- Chaenostoma glabratum Benth. endemic
- Chaenostoma glanduliferum (Hilliard) Kornhall, endemic
- Chaenostoma halimifolium Benth. indigenous
- Chaenostoma hispidum (Thunb.) Benth. endemic
- Chaenostoma impeditum (Hilliard) Kornhall, endemic
- Chaenostoma integrifolium (L.f.) Benth. endemic
- Chaenostoma langebergense (Hilliard) Kornhall, endemic
- Chaenostoma leve (Hiern) Kornhall, indigenous
- Chaenostoma linifolium (Thunb.) Benth. accepted as Chaenostoma uncinatum (Desr.) Kornhall
  - Chaenostoma linifolium (Thunb.) Benth. var. hispidum Bernh. accepted as Chaenostoma uncinatum (Desr.) Kornhall
- Chaenostoma longipedicellatum (Hilliard) Kornhall, endemic
- Chaenostoma macrosiphon Schltr. endemic
- Chaenostoma marifolium Benth. endemic
- Chaenostoma multiramosum (Hilliard) Kornhall, endemic
- Chaenostoma neglectum J.M.Wood & M.S.Evans, indigenous
- Chaenostoma paniculatum (Hilliard) Kornhall, endemic
- Chaenostoma patrioticum (Hiern) Kornhall, indigenous
- Chaenostoma pauciflorum Benth. endemic
- Chaenostoma placidum (Hilliard) Kornhall, endemic
- Chaenostoma platysepalum (Hiern) Kornhall, endemic
- Chaenostoma polelense (Hiern) Kornhall, indigenous
  - Chaenostoma polelense (Hiern) Kornhall subsp. fraterna (Hilliard) Kornhall, indigenous
  - Chaenostoma polelense (Hiern) Kornhall subsp. polelense, indigenous
- Chaenostoma polyanthum Benth. endemic
- Chaenostoma procumbens Benth. accepted as Chaenostoma polyanthum Benth.
- Chaenostoma pumilum Benth. accepted as Chaenostoma halimifolium Benth.
- Chaenostoma racemosum Benth., endemic
- Chaenostoma revolutum (Thunb.) Benth. endemic
- Chaenostoma roseoflavum (Hiern) Kornhall, endemic
- Chaenostoma rotundifolium Benth. endemic
- Chaenostoma subnudum N.E.Br. endemic
- Chaenostoma subsessile (Hilliard) Kornhall, endemic
- Chaenostoma subspicatum Benth. endemic
- Chaenostoma tenuicaule (Hilliard) Kornhall, endemic
- Chaenostoma titanophilum (Hilliard) Kornhall, endemic
- Chaenostoma uncinatum (Desr.) Kornhall, endemic
- Chaenostoma violaceum Schltr. endemic

== Chamaecrypta ==
Genus Chamaecrypta:

- Chamaecrypta diasciifolia Schltr. & Diels, endemic

== Chenopodiopsis ==
Genus Chenopodiopsis:

- Chenopodiopsis chenopodioides (Diels) Hilliard, endemic
- Chenopodiopsis hirta (L.f.) Hilliard, endemic
- Chenopodiopsis retrorsa Hilliard, endemic

== Colpias ==
Genus Colpias:

- Colpias mollis E.Mey. ex Benth. endemic

== Cromidon ==
Genus Cromidon:

- Cromidon austerum Hilliard, endemic
- Cromidon confusum Hilliard, endemic
- Cromidon corrigioloides (Rolfe) Compton, endemic
- Cromidon decumbens (Thunb.) Hilliard, endemic
- Cromidon dregei Hilliard, endemic
- Cromidon gracile Hilliard, endemic
- Cromidon hamulosum (E.Mey.) Hilliard, endemic
- Cromidon microechinos Hilliard, endemic
- Cromidon minutum (Rolfe) Hilliard, indigenous
- Cromidon plantaginis (L.f.) Hilliard, endemic
- Cromidon varicalyx Hilliard, endemic

== Dermatobotrys ==
Genus Dermatobotrys:

- Dermatobotrys saundersii Bolus ex Oliv. endemic

== Diascia ==
Genus Diascia:

- Diascia aliciae Hiern, endemic
- Diascia alonsooides Benth. endemic
- Diascia anastrepta Hilliard & B.L.Burtt, indigenous
- Diascia appendiculata K.E.Steiner, endemic
- Diascia austromontana K.E.Steiner, indigenous
- Diascia avasmontana Dinter, accepted as Chaenostoma patrioticum (Hiern) Kornhall
- Diascia barberae Hook.f. indigenous
- Diascia batteniana K.E.Steiner, endemic
- Diascia bergiana Link & Otto, endemic
- Diascia bicolor K.E.Steiner, endemic
- Diascia caitliniae K.E.Steiner, indigenous
- Diascia capensis (L.) Britten, endemic
- Diascia capsularis Benth. indigenous
- Diascia cardiosepala Hiern, endemic
- Diascia collina K.E.Steiner, endemic
- Diascia cordata N.E.Br. indigenous
- Diascia cuneata E.Mey. ex Benth. endemic
- Diascia decipiens K.E.Steiner, endemic
- Diascia dielsiana Schltr. ex Hiern, endemic
- Diascia diffusa Benth. endemic
- Diascia dissecta Hiern, accepted as Alonsoa unilabiata (L.f.) Steud. present
- Diascia dissimulans Hilliard & B.L.Burtt, endemic
- Diascia ellaphieae K.E.Steiner, endemic
- Diascia elongata Benth. endemic
- Diascia engleri Diels, indigenous
- Diascia esterhuyseniae K.E.Steiner, endemic
- Diascia fetcaniensis Hilliard & B.L.Burtt, indigenous
- Diascia fragrans K.E.Steiner, endemic
- Diascia glandulosa E.Phillips, indigenous
  - Diascia glandulosa E.Phillips var. albiflora E.Phillips, endemic
  - Diascia glandulosa E.Phillips var. glandulosa, endemic
- Diascia gracilis Schltr. endemic
- Diascia heterandra Benth. accepted as Alonsoa unilabiata (L.f.) Steud. present
- Diascia hexensis K.E.Steiner, endemic
- Diascia humilis K.E.Steiner, endemic
- Diascia insignis K.E.Steiner, endemic
- Diascia integerrima E.Mey. ex Benth. indigenous
- Diascia lewisiae K.E.Steiner, endemic
- Diascia lilacina Hilliard & B.L.Burtt, endemic
- Diascia longicornis (Thunb.) Druce, endemic
- Diascia macrophylla (Thunb.) Spreng. endemic
- Diascia maculata K.E.Steiner, endemic
- Diascia megathura Hilliard & B.L.Burtt, indigenous
- Diascia minutiflora Hiern, indigenous
- Diascia mollis Hilliard & B.L.Burtt, endemic
- Diascia namaquensis Hiern, endemic
- Diascia nana Diels, endemic
- Diascia nodosa K.E.Steiner, indigenous
- Diascia nutans Diels, accepted as Alonsoa unilabiata (L.f.) Steud. present
- Diascia pachyceras E.Mey. ex Benth. endemic
- Diascia parviflora Benth. endemic
- Diascia patens (Thunb.) Grant ex Fourc. endemic
- Diascia pentheri Schltr. endemic
- Diascia personata Hilliard & B.L.Burtt, endemic
- Diascia purpurea N.E.Br. indigenous
- Diascia pusilla K.E.Steiner, endemic
- Diascia racemulosa Benth. endemic
- Diascia ramosa Scott-Elliot, endemic
- Diascia rigescens E.Mey. ex Benth. endemic
- Diascia rudolphii Hiern, endemic
- Diascia runcinata E.Mey. ex Benth. indigenous
- Diascia sacculata Benth. endemic
- Diascia scullyi Hiern, accepted as Hemimeris racemosa (Houtt.) Merr. present
- Diascia stachyoides Schltr. ex Hiern, indigenous
- Diascia stricta Hilliard & B.L.Burtt, endemic
- Diascia tanyceras E.Mey. ex Benth. endemic
- Diascia transkeiana Hilliard & B.L.Burtt, accepted as Diascia mollis Hilliard & B.L.Burtt, present
- Diascia tugelensis Hilliard & B.L.Burtt, endemic
- Diascia unilabiata (L.f.) Benth. accepted as Alonsoa unilabiata (L.f.) Steud. present
- Diascia veronicoides Schltr. endemic
- Diascia vigilis Hilliard & B.L.Burtt, indigenous

== Diclis ==
Genus Diclis:

- Diclis petiolaris Benth. indigenous
- Diclis reptans Benth. indigenous
- Diclis rotundifolia (Hiern) Hilliard & B.L.Burtt, indigenous
- Diclis stellarioides Hiern, endemic

== Dischisma ==
Genus Dischisma:

- Dischisma arenarium E.Mey. endemic
- Dischisma capitatum (Thunb.) Choisy, endemic
  - Dischisma ciliatum (P.J.Bergius) Choisy, indigenous
  - Dischisma ciliatum (P.J.Bergius) Choisy subsp. ciliatum, endemic
  - Dischisma ciliatum (P.J.Bergius) Choisy subsp. erinoides (L.f.) Roessler, endemic
  - Dischisma ciliatum (P.J.Bergius) Choisy subsp. flaccum (E.Mey.) Roessler, endemic
- Dischisma clandestinum E.Mey., endemic
- Dischisma crassum Rolfe, endemic
- Dischisma fruticosum (L.f.) Rolfe, endemic
- Dischisma leptostachyum E.Mey. endemic
- Dischisma spicatum (Thunb.) Choisy, indigenous
- Dischisma squarrosum Schltr. endemic
- Dischisma struthioloides Killick, endemic
- Dischisma tomentosum Schltr. endemic

== Freylinia ==
Genus Freylinia:

- Freylinia crispa Van Jaarsv. endemic
- Freylinia decurrens Levyns ex Van Jaarsv. accepted as Freylinia densiflora Benth. present
- Freylinia densiflora Benth. endemic
- Freylinia helmei Van Jaarsv. endemic
- Freylinia lanceolata (L.f.) G.Don, endemic
- Freylinia longiflora Benth. endemic
- Freylinia tropica S.Moore, indigenous
- Freylinia undulata (L.f.) Benth. endemic
- Freylinia visseri Van Jaarsv. endemic
- Freylinia vlokii Van Jaarsv. endemic

== Glekia ==
Genus Glekia:

- Glekia krebsiana (Benth.) Hilliard, indigenous

== Globulariopsis ==
Genus Globulariopsis:

- Globulariopsis adpressa (Choisy) Hilliard, endemic
- Globulariopsis montana Hilliard, endemic
- Globulariopsis obtusiloba Hilliard, endemic
- Globulariopsis pumila Hilliard, endemic
- Globulariopsis stricta (P.J.Bergius) Hilliard, endemic
- Globulariopsis tephrodes (E.Mey.) Hilliard, endemic
- Globulariopsis wittebergensis Compton, endemic

== Glumicalyx ==
Genus Glumicalyx:

- Glumicalyx apiculatus (E.Mey.) Hilliard & B.L.Burtt, endemic
- Glumicalyx flanaganii (Hiern) Hilliard & B.L.Burtt, indigenous
- Glumicalyx goseloides (Diels) Hilliard & B.L.Burtt, endemic
- Glumicalyx montanus Hiern, indigenous
- Glumicalyx nutans (Rolfe) Hilliard & B.L.Burtt, indigenous

== Gomphostigma ==
Genus Gomphostigma:

- Gomphostigma incomptum (L.f.) N.E.Br. endemic
- Gomphostigma virgatum (L.f.) Baill. indigenous

== Gosela ==
Genus Gosela:

- Gosela eckloniana Choisy, endemic

== Gratiola ==
Genus Gratiola:

- Gratiola parviflora Roxb. accepted as Lindernia parviflora (Roxb.) Haines, indigenous

== Hebenstretia ==
Genus Hebenstretia:

- Hebenstretia angolensis Rolfe, indigenous
- Hebenstretia anomala Roessler, endemic
- Hebenstretia comosa Hochst. indigenous
- Hebenstretia cordata L. indigenous
- Hebenstretia dentata L. endemic
- Hebenstretia dregei Rolfe, endemic
- Hebenstretia dura Choisy, indigenous
- Hebenstretia fastigiosa Jaroscz, endemic
- Hebenstretia glaucescens Schltr. endemic
- Hebenstretia hamulosa E.Mey. endemic
- Hebenstretia holubii Rolfe, accepted as Hebenstretia angolensis Rolfe
- Hebenstretia integrifolia L. indigenous
- Hebenstretia kamiesbergensis Roessler, endemic
- Hebenstretia lanceolata (E.Mey.) Rolfe, endemic
- Hebenstretia minutiflora Rolfe, indigenous
- Hebenstretia namaquensis Roessler, indigenous
- Hebenstretia neglecta Roessler, endemic
- Hebenstretia oatesii Rolfe, indigenous
  - Hebenstretia oatesii Rolfe subsp. oatesii, indigenous
  - Hebenstretia oatesii Rolfe subsp. rhodesiana Roessler, indigenous
- Hebenstretia paarlensis Roessler, endemic
- Hebenstretia parviflora E.Mey. indigenous
- Hebenstretia ramosissima Jaroscz, endemic
- Hebenstretia rehmannii Rolfe, endemic
- Hebenstretia repens Jaroscz, endemic
- Hebenstretia robusta E.Mey. endemic
- Hebenstretia sarcocarpa Bolus ex Rolfe, endemic

== Hemimeris ==
Genus Hemimeris:

- Hemimeris centrodes Hiern, endemic
- Hemimeris gracilis Schltr. endemic
- Hemimeris montana L.f. accepted as Hemimeris racemosa (Houtt.) Merr. present
- Hemimeris racemosa (Houtt.) Merr. endemic
- Hemimeris sabulosa L.f. endemic

== Jamesbrittenia ==
Genus Jamesbrittenia:

- Jamesbrittenia accrescens (Hiern) Hilliard, endemic
- Jamesbrittenia adpressa (Dinter) Hilliard, indigenous
- Jamesbrittenia albanensis Hilliard, endemic
- Jamesbrittenia albiflora (I.Verd.) Hilliard, endemic
- Jamesbrittenia albomarginata Hilliard, endemic
- Jamesbrittenia amplexicaulis (Benth.) Hilliard, endemic
- Jamesbrittenia argentea (L.f.) Hilliard, endemic
- Jamesbrittenia aridicola Hilliard, indigenous
- Jamesbrittenia aspalathoides (Benth.) Hilliard, endemic
- Jamesbrittenia aspleniifolia Hilliard, indigenous
- Jamesbrittenia atropurpurea (Benth.) Hilliard, indigenous
  - Jamesbrittenia atropurpurea (Benth.) Hilliard subsp. atropurpurea, indigenous
  - Jamesbrittenia atropurpurea (Benth.) Hilliard subsp. pubescens Hilliard, indigenous
- Jamesbrittenia aurantiaca (Burch.) Hilliard, indigenous
- Jamesbrittenia bergae Lemmer, endemic
- Jamesbrittenia breviflora (Schltr.) Hilliard, indigenous
- Jamesbrittenia burkeana (Benth.) Hilliard, indigenous
- Jamesbrittenia calciphila Hilliard, endemic
- Jamesbrittenia candida Hilliard, endemic
- Jamesbrittenia canescens (Benth.) Hilliard, indigenous
  - Jamesbrittenia canescens (Benth.) Hilliard var. canescens, indigenous
  - Jamesbrittenia canescens (Benth.) Hilliard var. seineri (Pilg.) Hilliard, indigenous
- Jamesbrittenia crassicaulis (Benth.) Hilliard, endemic
- Jamesbrittenia dentatisepala (Overkott) Hilliard, indigenous
- Jamesbrittenia filicaulis (Benth.) Hilliard, indigenous
- Jamesbrittenia foliolosa (Benth.) Hilliard, endemic
- Jamesbrittenia fruticosa (Benth.) Hilliard, indigenous
- Jamesbrittenia glutinosa (Benth.) Hilliard, indigenous
- Jamesbrittenia grandiflora (Galpin) Hilliard, indigenous
- Jamesbrittenia huillana (Diels) Hilliard, indigenous
- Jamesbrittenia incisa (Thunb.) Hilliard, indigenous
- Jamesbrittenia integerrima (Benth.) Hilliard, indigenous
- Jamesbrittenia kraussiana (Bernh.) Hilliard, endemic
- Jamesbrittenia macrantha (Codd) Hilliard, endemic
- Jamesbrittenia major (Pilg.) Hilliard, indigenous
- Jamesbrittenia maritima (Hiern) Hilliard, endemic
- Jamesbrittenia maxii (Hiern) Hilliard, indigenous
- Jamesbrittenia megadenia Hilliard, indigenous
- Jamesbrittenia megaphylla Hilliard, indigenous
- Jamesbrittenia merxmuelleri (Roessler) Hilliard, indigenous
- Jamesbrittenia micrantha (Klotzsch) Hilliard, indigenous
- Jamesbrittenia microphylla (L.f.) Hilliard, endemic
- Jamesbrittenia montana (Diels) Hilliard, indigenous
- Jamesbrittenia multisecta Hilliard, endemic
- Jamesbrittenia namaquensis Hilliard, endemic
- Jamesbrittenia pedunculosa (Benth.) Hilliard, endemic
- Jamesbrittenia phlogiflora (Benth.) Hilliard, endemic
- Jamesbrittenia pinnatifida (L.f.) Hilliard, endemic
- Jamesbrittenia pristisepala (Hiern) Hilliard, indigenous
- Jamesbrittenia racemosa (Benth.) Hilliard, endemic
- Jamesbrittenia ramosissima (Hiern) Hilliard, indigenous
- Jamesbrittenia silenoides (Hilliard) Hilliard, endemic
- Jamesbrittenia stellata Hilliard, endemic
- Jamesbrittenia stricta (Benth.) Hilliard, indigenous
- Jamesbrittenia tenella (Hiern) Hilliard, indigenous
- Jamesbrittenia tenuifolia (Bernh.) Hilliard, endemic
- Jamesbrittenia thunbergii (G.Don) Hilliard, endemic
- Jamesbrittenia tortuosa (Benth.) Hilliard, endemic
- Jamesbrittenia tysonii (Hiern) Hilliard, endemic
- Jamesbrittenia zuurbergensis Hilliard, endemic

== Limosella ==
Genus Limosella:

- Limosella africana Gluck, indigenous
  - Limosella africana Gluck var. africana, indigenous
  - Limosella africana Gluck var. macrosperma Gluck, indigenous
- Limosella aquatica L. indigenous
- Limosella australis R.Br. indigenous
- Limosella coerulea Burch. accepted as Limosella grandiflora Benth. present
- Limosella grandiflora Benth. indigenous
- Limosella inflata Hilliard & B.L.Burtt, indigenous
- Limosella longiflora Kuntze, indigenous
- Limosella maior Diels, indigenous
- Limosella natans Spreng. ex Drege, accepted as Limosella grandiflora Benth.
- Limosella pretoriensis Suess. endemic
- Limosella vesiculosa Hilliard & B.L.Burtt, indigenous

== Lyperia ==
Genus Lyperia:

- Lyperia antirrhinoides (L.f.) Hilliard, endemic
- Lyperia formosa Hilliard, endemic
- Lyperia lychnidea (L.) Druce, endemic
- Lyperia tenuiflora Benth. endemic
- Lyperia tristis (L.f.) Benth. indigenous
- Lyperia violacea (Link ex Jaroscz) Benth. endemic

== Manulea ==
Genus Manulea:

- Manulea acutiloba Hilliard, endemic
- Manulea adenocalyx Hilliard, endemic
- Manulea adenodes Hilliard, endemic
- Manulea aethiopica (L.) Thunb. accepted as Chaenostoma aethiopicum (L.) Benth.
- Manulea altissima L.f. indigenous
  - Manulea altissima L.f. subsp. altissima, endemic
  - Manulea altissima L.f. subsp. glabricaulis (Hiern) Hilliard, endemic
  - Manulea altissima L.f. subsp. longifolia (Benth.) Hilliard, endemic
- Manulea androsacea E.Mey. ex Benth. indigenous
- Manulea angustifolia Link & Otto, accepted as Manulea rubra (P.J.Bergius) L.f. present
- Manulea annua (Hiern) Hilliard, endemic
- Manulea arabidea Schltr. ex Hiern, endemic
- Manulea aridicola Hilliard, indigenous
- Manulea augei (Hiern) Hilliard, endemic
- Manulea bellidifolia Benth. endemic
- Manulea benthamiana Hiern, accepted as Manulea corymbosa L.f. present
- Manulea buchneroides Hilliard & B.L.Burtt, indigenous
- Manulea burchellii Hiern, indigenous
- Manulea caerulea L.f. accepted as Chaenostoma caeruleum (L.f.) Kornhall
- Manulea calciphila Hilliard, endemic
- Manulea caledonica Hilliard, endemic
- Manulea campestris Hiern, accepted as Manulea gariepina Benth. present
- Manulea cephalotes Thunb. endemic
- Manulea cheiranthus (L.) L. endemic
- Manulea chrysantha Hilliard, endemic
- Manulea cinerea Hilliard, endemic
- Manulea cordata Thunb. accepted as Chaenostoma cordatum (Thunb.) Benth.
- Manulea corymbosa L.f. endemic
- Manulea crassifolia Benth. subsp. crassifolia, indigenous
  - Manulea crassifolia Benth. subsp. thodeana (Diels) Hilliard, indigenous
- Manulea decipiens Hilliard, endemic
- Manulea densiflora Benth. accepted as Manulea cephalotes Thunb. present
- Manulea derustiana Hilliard, endemic
- Manulea deserticola Hilliard, endemic
- Manulea diandra Hilliard, endemic
- Manulea dregei Hilliard & B.L.Burtt, indigenous
- Manulea exigua Hilliard, endemic
- Manulea flanaganii Hilliard, endemic
- Manulea floribunda (Benth.) Kuntze, accepted as Chaenostoma floribundum Benth.
- Manulea florifera Hilliard & B.L.Burtt, endemic
- Manulea fragrans Schltr. endemic
- Manulea gariepina Benth. indigenous
  - Manulea gariepina Benth. subsp. campestris (Hiern) Roessler, accepted as Manulea gariepina Benth. present
- Manulea gariesiana Hilliard, endemic
- Manulea glandulosa E.Phillips, endemic
- Manulea halimifolia (Benth.) Kuntze, accepted as Chaenostoma halimifolium Benth.
- Manulea hispida Thunb. accepted as Chaenostoma hispidum (Thunb.) Benth.
- Manulea incana Thunb. endemic
- Manulea incisiflora Hiern, accepted as Manulea silenoides E.Mey. ex Benth. present
- Manulea integrifolia L.f. accepted as Chaenostoma integrifolium (L.f.) Benth.
- Manulea juncea Benth. endemic
- Manulea karrooica Hilliard, endemic
- Manulea latiloba Hilliard, endemic
- Manulea laxa Schltr. endemic
- Manulea leiostachys Benth. endemic
- Manulea leptosiphon Thell. indigenous
- Manulea linearifolia Hilliard, endemic
- Manulea linifolia Thunb. accepted as Chaenostoma uncinatum (Desr.) Kornhall
- Manulea minor Diels, endemic
- Manulea minuscula Hilliard, indigenous
- Manulea montana Hilliard, endemic
- Manulea multispicata Hilliard, endemic
- Manulea nervosa E.Mey. ex Benth. endemic
- Manulea obovata Benth. endemic
- Manulea obtusa Hiern, endemic
- Manulea oppositiflora Vent. accepted as Chaenostoma hispidum (Thunb.) Benth.
  - Manulea oppositiflora Vent. var. angustifolia Kuntze, accepted as Chaenostoma halimifolium Benth.
- Manulea ovatifolia Hilliard, endemic
- Manulea paniculata Benth. indigenous
- Manulea parviflora Benth. indigenous
  - Manulea parviflora Benth. var. limonioides (Conrath) Hilliard, endemic
  - Manulea parviflora Benth. var. parviflora, indigenous
- Manulea paucibarbata Hilliard, endemic
- Manulea pillansii Hilliard, endemic
- Manulea plurirosulata Hilliard, endemic
- Manulea praeterita Hilliard, endemic
- Manulea psilostoma Hilliard, endemic
- Manulea pusilla E.Mey. ex Benth. endemic
- Manulea ramulosa Hilliard, endemic
- Manulea rhodantha Hilliard, indigenous
  - Manulea rhodantha Hilliard subsp. aurantiaca Hilliard, endemic
  - Manulea rhodantha Hilliard subsp. rhodantha, indigenous
- Manulea rigida Benth., endemic
- Manulea robusta Pilg. indigenous
- Manulea rotata Desr. accepted as Chaenostoma caeruleum (L.f.) Kornhall
- Manulea rubra (P.J.Bergius) L.f. endemic
  - Manulea rubra (P.J.Bergius) L.f. var. turritis (Benth.) Hiern, accepted as Manulea turritis Benth. present
- Manulea schaeferi Pilg. indigenous
- Manulea silenoides E.Mey. ex Benth. endemic
- Manulea stellata Benth. endemic
- Manulea thyrsiflora L.f. endemic
  - Manulea thyrsiflora L.f. var. versicolor Kuntze, accepted as Chaenostoma floribundum Benth.
- Manulea tomentosa (L.) L., endemic
- Manulea turritis Benth. endemic
- Manulea uncinata Desr. accepted as Chaenostoma uncinatum (Desr.) Kornhall
- Manulea virgata Thunb. endemic
- Manulea viscosa (Aiton) Willd. accepted as Chaenostoma caeruleum (L.f.) Kornhall

== Melanospermum ==
Genus Melanospermum:

- Melanospermum foliosum (Benth.) Hilliard, indigenous
- Melanospermum italae Hilliard, indigenous
- Melanospermum rudolfii Hilliard, endemic
- Melanospermum rupestre (Hiern) Hilliard, endemic
- Melanospermum swazicum Hilliard, indigenous
- Melanospermum transvaalense (Hiern) Hilliard, endemic

== Microdon ==
Genus Microdon:

- Microdon bracteatus (Thunb.) I.H.Hartley, accepted as Microdon parviflorus (P.J.Bergius) Hilliard, present
- Microdon capitatus (P.J.Bergius) Levyns, endemic
- Microdon cylindricus E.Mey. accepted as Microdon polygaloides (L.f.) Druce, present
- Microdon dubius (L.) Hilliard, endemic
- Microdon linearis Choisy, endemic
- Microdon nitidus (E.Mey.) Hilliard, endemic
- Microdon orbicularis Choisy, endemic
- Microdon parviflorus (P.J.Bergius) Hilliard, endemic
- Microdon polygaloides (L.f.) Druce, endemic

== Myoporum ==
Genus Myoporum:

- Myoporum insulare R.Br. not indigenous, naturalised, invasive
- Myoporum laetum G.Forst. not indigenous, naturalised, invasive
- Myoporum montanum R.Br. not indigenous, naturalised, invasive
- Myoporum tenuifolium G.Forst. not indigenous, naturalised

== Nemesia ==
Genus Nemesia:

- Nemesia acornis K.E.Steiner, endemic
- Nemesia acuminata Benth. endemic
- Nemesia affinis Benth. endemic
- Nemesia albiflora N.E.Br. indigenous
- Nemesia anfracta Hiern, endemic
- Nemesia anisocarpa E.Mey. ex Benth. indigenous
- Nemesia arenifera Bester & H.M.Steyn, endemic
- Nemesia aurantia K.E.Steiner, endemic
- Nemesia azurea Diels, endemic
- Nemesia barbata (Thunb.) Benth. endemic
- Nemesia bicornis (L.) Pers., endemic
- Nemesia bodkinii Bolus, endemic
- Nemesia brevicalcarata Schltr. endemic
- Nemesia caerulea Hiern, indigenous
- Nemesia calcarata E.Mey. ex Benth. endemic
- Nemesia cheiranthus E.Mey. ex Benth. endemic
- Nemesia chrysolopha Diels, endemic
- Nemesia cynanchifolia Benth. indigenous
- Nemesia deflexa Grant ex K.E.Steiner, endemic
- Nemesia denticulata (Benth.) Grant ex Fourc. endemic
- Nemesia diffusa Benth. indigenous
  - Nemesia diffusa Benth. var. diffusa, endemic
  - Nemesia diffusa Benth. var. rigida Benth. endemic
- Nemesia elata K.E.Steiner, indigenous
- Nemesia euryceras Schltr. endemic
- Nemesia fleckii Thell. indigenous
- Nemesia floribunda Lehm. indigenous
- Nemesia foetens Vent. accepted as Nemesia fruticans (Thunb.) Benth. indigenous
- Nemesia fourcadei K.E.Steiner, indigenous
- Nemesia fruticans (Thunb.) Benth. indigenous
- Nemesia glabriuscula Hilliard & B.L.Burtt, endemic
- Nemesia glaucescens Hiern, endemic
- Nemesia gracilis Benth. endemic
- Nemesia grandiflora Diels, endemic
- Nemesia guthriei Hiern, accepted as Nemesia barbata (Thunb.) Benth. present
- Nemesia hanoverica Hiern, endemic
- Nemesia hemiptera K.E.Steiner, endemic
- Nemesia ionantha Diels, endemic
- Nemesia karroensis Bond, endemic
- Nemesia lanceolata Hiern, endemic
- Nemesia leipoldtii Hiern, endemic
- Nemesia ligulata E.Mey. ex Benth. endemic
- Nemesia lilacina N.E.Br. indigenous
- Nemesia linearis Vent. indigenous
- Nemesia lucida Benth. endemic
- Nemesia macrocarpa (Aiton) Druce, endemic
- Nemesia macroceras Schltr. indigenous
  - Nemesia macroceras Schltr. var. crocea Schltr. endemic
  - Nemesia macroceras Schltr. var. macroceras, endemic
- Nemesia maxii Hiern, endemic
- Nemesia melissifolia Benth. indigenous
- Nemesia micrantha Hiern, endemic
- Nemesia pageae L.Bolus, endemic
- Nemesia pallida Hiern, endemic
- Nemesia parviflora Benth. indigenous
- Nemesia petiolina Hiern, endemic
- Nemesia picta Schltr. endemic
- Nemesia pinnata (L.f.) E.Mey. ex Benth. endemic
- Nemesia platysepala Diels, endemic
- Nemesia psammophila Schltr. endemic
- Nemesia pubescens Benth. indigenous
  - Nemesia pubescens Benth. var. glabrior Benth. ex Hiern, endemic
  - Nemesia pubescens Benth. var. pubescens, indigenous
- Nemesia pulchella Schltr. ex Hiern, endemic
- Nemesia rupicola Hilliard, indigenous
- Nemesia saccata E.Mey. ex Benth. endemic
- Nemesia silvatica Hilliard, endemic
- Nemesia strumosa (Banks ex Benth.) Benth. endemic
- Nemesia suaveolens K.E.Steiner, endemic
- Nemesia umbonata (Hiern) Hilliard & B.L.Burtt, indigenous
- Nemesia versicolor E.Mey. ex Benth., indigenous
  - Nemesia versicolor E.Mey. ex Benth. var. oxyceras Benth. endemic
  - Nemesia versicolor E.Mey. ex Benth. var. versicolor, endemic
- Nemesia viscosa E.Mey. ex Benth. indigenous
- Nemesia williamsonii K.E.Steiner, indigenous
- Nemesia zimbabwensis Rendle, indigenous

== Nemia ==
Genus Nemia:

- Nemia rubra P.J.Bergius, accepted as Manulea rubra (P.J.Bergius) L.f. present

== Oftia ==
Genus Oftia:

- Oftia africana (L.) Bocq. endemic
- Oftia glabra Compton, endemic
- Oftia revoluta (E.Mey.) Bocq. endemic

== Peliostomum ==
Genus Peliostomum:

- Peliostomum calycinum N.E.Br. indigenous
- Peliostomum junceum (Hiern) Kolberg & Van Slageren, indigenous
- Peliostomum leucorrhizum E.Mey. ex Benth. indigenous
  - Peliostomum leucorrhizum E.Mey. ex Benth. var. grandiflorum Hiern, accepted as Peliostomum leucorrhizum E.Mey. ex Benth. endemic
  - Peliostomum leucorrhizum E.Mey. ex Benth. var. junceum Hiern, accepted as Peliostomum junceum (Hiern) Kolberg & Van Slageren, indigenous
  - Peliostomum leucorrhizum E.Mey. ex Benth. var. linearifolium (Schinz ex Kuntze) Emil Weber, accepted as Peliostomum leucorrhizum E.Mey. ex Benth. indigenous
- Peliostomum linearifolium Schinz ex Kuntze, accepted as Peliostomum leucorrhizum E.Mey. ex Benth. indigenous
- Peliostomum lugardiae N.E.Br. ex Hemsl. & Skan, accepted as Peliostomum leucorrhizum E.Mey. ex Benth. indigenous
- Peliostomum marlothii Engl. accepted as Aptosimum marlothii (Engl.) Hiern, indigenous
- Peliostomum oppositifolium Engl. accepted as Jamesbrittenia fruticosa (Benth.) Hilliard, present
- Peliostomum origanoides E.Mey. ex Benth. endemic
- Peliostomum scoparium E.Mey. ex Benth. accepted as Anticharis scoparia (E.Mey. ex Benth.) Hiern ex Benth. & Hook.f. indigenous
- Peliostomum virgatum E.Mey. ex Benth. indigenous
- Peliostomum viscosum E.Mey. ex Benth. indigenous

== Phygelius ==
Genus Phygelius:

- Phygelius aequalis Harv. ex Hiern, indigenous
- Phygelius capensis E.Mey. ex Benth. indigenous

== Phyllopodium ==
Genus Phyllopodium:

- Phyllopodium alpinum N.E.Br. endemic
- Phyllopodium anomalum Hilliard, endemic
- Phyllopodium bracteatum Benth. endemic
- Phyllopodium caespitosum Hilliard, endemic
- Phyllopodium capillare (L.f.) Hilliard, endemic
- Phyllopodium capitatum (L.f.) Benth. accepted as Phyllopodium heterophyllum (L.f.) Benth. present
- Phyllopodium cephalophorum (Thunb.) Hilliard, endemic
- Phyllopodium collinum (Hiern) Hilliard, indigenous
- Phyllopodium cordatum (Thunb.) Hilliard, endemic
- Phyllopodium cuneifolium (L.f.) Benth. endemic
- Phyllopodium diffusum Benth. endemic
- Phyllopodium dolomiticum Hilliard, endemic
- Phyllopodium elegans (Choisy) Hilliard, endemic
- Phyllopodium heterophyllum (L.f.) Benth. endemic
- Phyllopodium hispidulum (Thell.) Hilliard, indigenous
- Phyllopodium lupuliforme (Thell.) Hilliard, endemic
- Phyllopodium maxii (Hiern) Hilliard, indigenous
- Phyllopodium micranthum (Schltr.) Hilliard, endemic
- Phyllopodium mimetes Hilliard, endemic
- Phyllopodium multifolium Hiern, endemic
- Phyllopodium namaense (Thell.) Hilliard, indigenous
- Phyllopodium phyllopodioides (Schltr.) Hilliard, endemic
- Phyllopodium pubiflorum Hilliard, endemic
- Phyllopodium pumilum Benth. indigenous
- Phyllopodium rustii (Rolfe) Hilliard, endemic
- Phyllopodium tweedense Hilliard, endemic
- Phyllopodium viscidissimum Hilliard, endemic

== Polycarena ==
Genus Polycarena:

- Polycarena aemulans Hilliard, endemic
- Polycarena aethiopica (L.) Druce, accepted as Chaenostoma aethiopicum (L.) Benth.
- Polycarena alpina (N.E.Br.) Levyns, accepted as Phyllopodium alpinum N.E.Br. present
- Polycarena arenaria Hiern, accepted as Polycarena pubescens Benth. present
- Polycarena aurea Benth. endemic
- Polycarena batteniana Hilliard, endemic
- Polycarena capensis (L.) Benth. endemic
- Polycarena comptonii Hilliard, endemic
- Polycarena exigua Hilliard, endemic
- Polycarena filiformis Diels, endemic
- Polycarena formosa Hilliard, endemic
- Polycarena gilioides Benth. endemic
- Polycarena glaucescens Hiern, accepted as Polycarena pubescens Benth. present
- Polycarena gracilipes N.E.Br. ex Hiern, accepted as Polycarena filiformis Diels, present
- Polycarena gracilis Hilliard, endemic
- Polycarena leipoldtii Hiern, accepted as Polycarena rariflora Benth. present
- Polycarena lilacina Hilliard, indigenous
  - Polycarena lilacina Hilliard var. difficilis Hilliard, endemic
  - Polycarena lilacina Hilliard var. lilacina, endemic
- Polycarena multifolia (Hiern) Levyns, accepted as Phyllopodium multifolium Hiern, present
- Polycarena nardouwensis Hilliard, endemic
- Polycarena pubescens Benth. indigenous
- Polycarena pumila (Benth.) Levyns, accepted as Phyllopodium pumilum Benth. present
- Polycarena rariflora Benth. endemic
- Polycarena silenoides Harv. ex Benth. endemic
- Polycarena sordida (Hiern) Levyns, accepted as Manulea augei (Hiern) Hilliard, present
- Polycarena subtilis Hilliard, endemic
- Polycarena tenella Hiern, endemic

== Pseudoselago ==
Genus Pseudoselago:

- Pseudoselago arguta (E.Mey.) Hilliard, endemic
- Pseudoselago ascendens (E.Mey.) Hilliard, endemic
- Pseudoselago bella Hilliard, endemic
- Pseudoselago burmannii (Choisy) Hilliard, endemic
- Pseudoselago caerulescens Hilliard, endemic
- Pseudoselago candida Hilliard, endemic
- Pseudoselago densifolia (Hochst.) Hilliard, endemic
- Pseudoselago diplotricha Hilliard, endemic
- Pseudoselago gracilis Hilliard, endemic
- Pseudoselago guttata (E.Mey.) Hilliard, endemic
- Pseudoselago hilliardiae J.C.Manning & Goldblatt, indigenous
- Pseudoselago humilis (Rolfe) Hilliard, endemic
- Pseudoselago langebergensis Hilliard, endemic
- Pseudoselago outeniquensis Hilliard, endemic
- Pseudoselago parvifolia Hilliard, endemic
- Pseudoselago peninsulae Hilliard, endemic
- Pseudoselago prolixa Hilliard, endemic
- Pseudoselago prostrata Hilliard, endemic
- Pseudoselago pulchra Hilliard, endemic
- Pseudoselago quadrangularis (Choisy) Hilliard, endemic
- Pseudoselago rapunculoides (L.) Hilliard, endemic
- Pseudoselago recurvifolia Hilliard, endemic
- Pseudoselago serrata (P.J.Bergius) Hilliard, endemic
- Pseudoselago similis Hilliard, endemic
- Pseudoselago spuria (L.) Hilliard, endemic
- Pseudoselago subglabra Hilliard, endemic
- Pseudoselago verbenacea (L.f.) Hilliard, endemic
- Pseudoselago violacea Hilliard, endemic

== Reyemia ==
Genus Reyemia:

- Reyemia chasmanthiflora Hilliard, accepted as Zaluzianskya chasmanthiflora (Hilliard) J.C.Manning & Goldblatt, endemic
- Reyemia nemesioides (Diels) Hilliard, accepted as Zaluzianskya nemesioides Diels, endemic

== Selago ==
Genus Selago:

- Selago acocksii Hilliard, endemic
- Selago acutibractea Hilliard, indigenous
- Selago adenodes Hilliard, endemic
- Selago adpressa Choisy, accepted as Globulariopsis adpressa (Choisy) Hilliard, present
- Selago albida Choisy, indigenous
- Selago albomarginata Hilliard, indigenous
- Selago albomontana Hilliard, endemic
- Selago angustibractea Hilliard, indigenous
- Selago articulata Thunb. endemic
- Selago ascendens E.Mey. accepted as Pseudoselago ascendens (E.Mey.) Hilliard, present
- Selago aspera Choisy, endemic
- Selago atherstonei Rolfe, endemic
- Selago barbula Harv. ex Rolfe, endemic
- Selago baurii (Hiern) Hilliard, endemic
- Selago beaniana Hilliard, endemic
- Selago bilacunosa Hilliard, endemic
- Selago bolusii Rolfe, endemic
- Selago brevifolia Rolfe, endemic
- Selago burchellii Rolfe, endemic
- Selago burkei Rolfe, endemic
- Selago burmannii Choisy, accepted as Pseudoselago burmannii (Choisy) Hilliard, present
- Selago canescens L.f. endemic
- Selago capitellata Schltr. endemic
- Selago capituliflora Rolfe, endemic
- Selago cecilae (Rolfe) Eyles, indigenous
- Selago cedrimontana Hilliard, endemic
- Selago centralis Hilliard, indigenous
- Selago chalarantha Hilliard, endemic
- Selago chongweënsis (Rolfe) Torre & Harms, accepted as Selago angolensis Rolfe, present
- Selago ciliata L.f. endemic
- Selago cinerea L.f., endemic
- Selago compacta Rolfe, indigenous
- Selago comptonii Hilliard, endemic
- Selago confusa Hilliard, endemic
- Selago congesta Rolfe, endemic
- Selago corymbosa L. endemic
- Selago crassifolia (Rolfe) Hilliard, endemic
- Selago cryptadenia Hilliard, endemic
- Selago cucullata Hilliard, indigenous
- Selago cupressoides Hilliard, endemic
- Selago curvifolia Rolfe, endemic
- Selago cylindrica Levyns, accepted as Selago scabrida Thunb. present
- Selago decipiens E.Mey. endemic
- Selago densiflora Rolfe, indigenous
- Selago densifolia Hochst., accepted as Pseudoselago densifolia (Hochst.) Hilliard, present
- Selago diabolica Hilliard, endemic
- Selago diffusa Thunb., endemic
- Selago dinteri Rolfe, indigenous
  - Selago dinteri Rolfe subsp. pseudodinteri Hilliard, indigenous
- Selago diosmoides Rolfe, accepted as Selago diffusa Thunb., present
- Selago distans E.Mey., endemic
- Selago divaricata L.f. indigenous
- Selago dolichonema Hilliard, endemic
- Selago dolosa Hilliard, endemic
- Selago dregeana Hilliard, endemic
- Selago dregei Rolfe, accepted as Selago luxurians Choisy, present
- Selago eckloniana Choisy, endemic
- Selago elata Rolfe, accepted as Selago procera Hilliard, present
- Selago elongata Hilliard, endemic
- Selago elsiae Hilliard, endemic
- Selago esterhuyseniae Hilliard, endemic
- Selago exigua Hilliard, endemic
- Selago farrago Hilliard, endemic
- Selago ferruginea Rolfe, endemic
- Selago flanaganii Rolfe, indigenous
- Selago florifera Hilliard, endemic
- Selago foliosa Rolfe, endemic
- Selago forbesii Rolfe, accepted as Selago canescens L.f. present
- Selago fourcadei Hilliard, endemic
- Selago fruticosa L. endemic
- Selago fruticulosa Rolfe, accepted as Selago fruticosa L. present
- Selago galpinii Schltr. indigenous
- Selago geniculata L.f. endemic
- Selago glabrata Choisy, endemic
- Selago glandulosa Choisy, endemic
- Selago gloiodes Hilliard, endemic
- Selago glomerata Thunb. endemic
- Selago glutinosa E.Mey. accepted as Selago dregeana Hilliard, indigenous
  - Selago glutinosa E.Mey. subsp. cylindriphylla Hilliard, endemic
  - Selago glutinosa E.Mey. subsp. glutinosa, endemic
- Selago gracilis (Rolfe) Hilliard, endemic
- Selago grandiceps Hilliard, endemic
- Selago griquana Hilliard, endemic
- Selago guttata E.Mey. accepted as Pseudoselago guttata (E.Mey.) Hilliard, present
- Selago herbacea Choisy, accepted as Phyllopodium cuneifolium (L.f.) Benth. present
- Selago hermannioides E.Mey. endemic
- Selago heterotricha Hilliard, endemic
- Selago hispida L.f., endemic
- Selago hoepfneri Rolfe, accepted as Selago welwitschii Rolfe var. welwitschii, present
- Selago humilis Rolfe, accepted as Pseudoselago humilis (Rolfe) Hilliard, present
- Selago hyssopifolia E.Mey. accepted as Selago tarachodes Hilliard, indigenous
  - Selago hyssopifolia E.Mey. subsp. hyssopifolia, endemic
  - Selago hyssopifolia E.Mey. subsp. retrotricha Hilliard, endemic
- Selago immersa Rolfe, endemic
- Selago impedita Hilliard, endemic
- Selago inaequifolia Hilliard, endemic
- Selago incisa Hochst. accepted as Pseudoselago ascendens (E.Mey.) Hilliard, present
- Selago inconstans Hilliard, endemic
- Selago innata Markotter, indigenous
- Selago intermedia Hilliard, endemic
- Selago junodii Rolfe, accepted as Selago rehmannii Rolfe, present
- Selago karooica Hilliard, endemic
- Selago lacunosa Klotzsch, indigenous
- Selago lamprocarpa Schltr. ex Rolfe, endemic
  - Selago lamprocarpa Schltr. ex Rolfe var. major Schltr. ex Rolfe, accepted as Selago oresigena Compton, present
- Selago laxiflora Choisy, accepted as Globulariopsis tephrodes (E.Mey.) Hilliard, present
- Selago lepidioides Rolfe, accepted as Selago peduncularis E.Mey. present
- Selago leptothrix Hilliard, endemic
- Selago levynsiae Hilliard, endemic
- Selago lilacina Hilliard, endemic
- Selago linearifolia Rolfe, endemic
- Selago linearis Rolfe, endemic
- Selago lobeliacea Hochst. accepted as Pseudoselago peninsulae Hilliard, present
- Selago longicalyx Hilliard, endemic
- Selago longiflora Rolfe, endemic
- Selago longipedicellata Rolfe, endemic
- Selago luxurians Choisy, endemic
- Selago lydenburgensis Rolfe, endemic
- Selago magnakarooica Hilliard, endemic
- Selago marlothii Hilliard, endemic
- Selago mediocris Hilliard, endemic
- Selago melliodora Hilliard, indigenous
- Selago michelliae Hilliard, endemic
- Selago micradenia Hilliard, endemic
- Selago minutissima Choisy, accepted as Selago divaricata L.f. present
- Selago mixta Hilliard, endemic
- Selago monticola J.M.Wood & M.S.Evans, endemic
- Selago montis-shebae Brenan, accepted as Tetraselago longituba (Rolfe) Hilliard & B.L.Burtt, present
- Selago morrisii Rolfe, endemic
- Selago mucronata Hilliard, endemic
- Selago muddii Rolfe, accepted as Selago atherstonei Rolfe, present
- Selago multiflora Hilliard, endemic
- Selago multispicata Hilliard, indigenous
- Selago mundii Rolfe, endemic
- Selago myriophylla Hilliard, endemic
- Selago myrtifolia Rchb. endemic
- Selago namaquensis Schltr. endemic
- Selago neglecta Hilliard, endemic
- Selago nigrescens Rolfe, endemic
- Selago nigromontana Hilliard, endemic
- Selago oppositifolia Hilliard, endemic
- Selago oresigena Compton, endemic
- Selago ovata Rolfe, accepted as Selago pinguicula E.Mey. present
- Selago pachypoda Rolfe, endemic
- Selago paniculata Thunb. endemic
- Selago parvibractea Hilliard, endemic
- Selago peduncularis E.Mey. endemic
- Selago pentheri Gand. accepted as Pseudoselago serrata (P.J.Bergius) Hilliard, present
- Selago perplexa Hilliard, endemic
- Selago persimilis Hilliard, endemic
- Selago pinea Link, endemic
- Selago pinguicula E.Mey. endemic
- Selago polycephala Otto ex Walp. endemic
- Selago polygala S.Moore, endemic
- Selago polystachya L. endemic
- Selago praetermissa Hilliard, endemic
- Selago procera Hilliard, indigenous
- Selago prostrata Hilliard, endemic
- Selago psammophila Hilliard, endemic
- Selago pubescens Rolfe, accepted as Selago burchellii Rolfe, present
- Selago pulchra Hilliard, endemic
- Selago punctata Rolfe, endemic
- Selago pustulosa Hilliard, endemic
- Selago quadrangularis Choisy, accepted as Pseudoselago quadrangularis (Choisy) Hilliard, present
- Selago ramosissima Rolfe, endemic
- Selago ramulosa E.Mey., accepted as Selago canescens L.f. present
- Selago recurva E.Mey. endemic
- Selago rehmannii Rolfe, endemic
- Selago retropilosa Hilliard, endemic
- Selago rigida Rolfe, endemic
- Selago robusta Rolfe, accepted as Selago pinguicula E.Mey. present
- Selago rotundifolia L.f. endemic
- Selago rubromontana Hilliard, endemic
- Selago rudolphii (Hiern) Levyns, accepted as Pseudoselago humilis (Rolfe) Hilliard, present
- Selago saundersiae Rolfe, accepted as Selago capitellata Schltr. present
- Selago saxatilis E.Mey. indigenous
- Selago scabribractea Hilliard, endemic
- Selago scabrida Thunb. endemic
- Selago schlechteri Rolfe, accepted as Selago galpinii Schltr.
- Selago serrata P.J.Bergius, accepted as Pseudoselago serrata (P.J.Bergius) Hilliard, present
- Selago seticaulis Hilliard, endemic
- Selago setulosa Rolfe, endemic
- Selago singularis Hilliard, endemic
- Selago speciosa Rolfe, indigenous
- Selago spectabilis Hilliard, endemic
- Selago spuria L. accepted as Pseudoselago spuria (L.) Hilliard, present
- Selago stenostachya Hilliard, endemic
- Selago stewartiae S.Moore, indigenous
- Selago stricta P.J.Bergius, accepted as Globulariopsis stricta (P.J.Bergius) Hilliard, present
- Selago subspinosa Hilliard, endemic
- Selago tarachodes Hilliard, endemic
- Selago tenuifolia (Rolfe) Hilliard, endemic
- Selago tenuis E.Mey. endemic
- Selago tephrodes E.Mey., accepted as Globulariopsis tephrodes (E.Mey.) Hilliard, present
- Selago thermalis Hilliard, endemic
- Selago thomii Rolfe, endemic
- Selago thunbergii Choisy, accepted as Selago canescens L.f. present
- Selago transvaalensis Rolfe, accepted as Tetraselago nelsonii (Rolfe) Hilliard & B.L.Burtt, present
- Selago trauseldii Killick, endemic
- Selago trichophylla Hilliard, endemic
- Selago trinervia E.Mey. endemic
- Selago triquetra L.f., endemic
- Selago valliscitri Hilliard, endemic
- Selago variicalyx Hilliard, endemic
- Selago venosa Hilliard, endemic
- Selago verbenacea L.f. accepted as Pseudoselago verbenacea (L.f.) Hilliard, present
- Selago verna Hilliard, endemic
- Selago villicalyx Rolfe, accepted as Selago pachypoda Rolfe, present
- Selago villicaulis Rolfe, endemic
- Selago villosa Rolfe, indigenous
- Selago welwitschii Rolfe, indigenous
  - Selago welwitschii Rolfe var. australis Hilliard, indigenous
  - Selago welwitschii Rolfe var. holubii (Rolfe) Brenan, indigenous
- Selago witbergensis E.Mey. indigenous
- Selago wittebergensis Compton, accepted as Globulariopsis montana Hilliard, present
- Selago woodii Rolfe, accepted as Selago peduncularis E.Mey. present
- Selago zeyheri Choisy, endemic
- Selago zeyheri Rolfe, accepted as Selago acocksii Hilliard, present
- Selago zuluensis Hilliard, endemic

== Sphenandra ==
Genus Sphenandra:

- Sphenandra cinerea Engl. accepted as Chaenostoma halimifolium Benth.
- Sphenandra coerulea (L.f.) Kuntze, accepted as Chaenostoma caeruleum (L.f.) Kornhall
- Sphenandra viscosa (Aiton) Benth. accepted as Chaenostoma caeruleum (L.f.) Kornhall

== Strobilopsis ==
Genus Strobilopsis:

- Strobilopsis wrightii Hilliard & B.L.Burtt, indigenous

== Sutera ==
Genus Sutera:

- Sutera accrescens Hiern, accepted as Jamesbrittenia accrescens (Hiern) Hilliard, present
- Sutera acutiloba (Pilg.) Overkott ex Roessler, accepted as Jamesbrittenia acutiloba (Pilg.) Hilliard
- Sutera adpressa Dinter, accepted as Jamesbrittenia adpressa (Dinter) Hilliard
- Sutera aethiopica (L.) Kuntze, accepted as Chaenostoma aethiopicum (L.) Benth. endemic
- Sutera affinis (Bernh.) Kuntze, accepted as Chaenostoma affine Bernh. endemic
- Sutera albiflora I.Verd. accepted as Jamesbrittenia albiflora (I.Verd.) Hilliard, present
- Sutera altoplana Hiern, accepted as Jamesbrittenia tysonii (Hiern) Hilliard, present
- Sutera amplexicaulis (Benth.) Hiern, accepted as Jamesbrittenia amplexicaulis (Benth.) Hilliard, present
- Sutera antirrhinoides (L.f.) Hiern, accepted as Lyperia antirrhinoides (L.f.) Hilliard, present
- Sutera archeri Compton, accepted as Chaenostoma archeri (Compton) Kornhall, endemic
- Sutera arcuata Hiern, accepted as Chaenostoma floribundum Benth. present
- Sutera argentea (L.f.) Hiern, accepted as Jamesbrittenia argentea (L.f.) Hilliard, present
- Sutera asbestina Hiern, accepted as Jamesbrittenia integerrima (Benth.) Hilliard, present
- Sutera aspalathoides (Benth.) Hiern, accepted as Jamesbrittenia aspalathoides (Benth.) Hilliard, present
- Sutera atrocaerulea Fourc. accepted as Jamesbrittenia tenuifolia (Bernh.) Hilliard, present
- Sutera atropurpurea (Benth.) Hiern, accepted as Jamesbrittenia atropurpurea (Benth.) Hilliard subsp. atropurpurea, present
- Sutera aurantiaca (Burch.) Hiern, accepted as Jamesbrittenia aurantiaca (Burch.) Hilliard, present
- Sutera batlapina Hiern, accepted as Jamesbrittenia integerrima (Benth.) Hilliard
- Sutera beverlyana Hilliard & B.L.Burtt, accepted as Jamesbrittenia beverlyana (Hilliard & B.L.Burtt) Hilliard
- Sutera brachiata Roth, accepted as Chaenostoma hispidum (Thunb.) Benth.
- Sutera bracteolata Hiern, accepted as Sutera cooperi Hiern, present
- Sutera burchellii Hiern, accepted as Sutera griquensis Hiern, present
- Sutera burkeana (Benth.) Hiern, accepted as Jamesbrittenia burkeana (Benth.) Hilliard, present
- Sutera caerulea (L.f.) Hiern, accepted as Chaenostoma caeruleum (L.f.) Kornhall, endemic
- Sutera calciphila Hilliard, accepted as Chaenostoma calciphilum (Hilliard) Kornhall, endemic
- Sutera calycina (Benth.) Kuntze, accepted as Chaenostoma calycinum Benth. endemic
- Sutera campanulata (Benth.) Kuntze, accepted as Chaenostoma campanulatum Benth. endemic
- Sutera canescens (Benth.) Hiern, accepted as Jamesbrittenia canescens (Benth.) Hilliard var. canescens, present
- Sutera cephalotes (Thunb.) Kuntze, accepted as Manulea cephalotes Thunb. present
- Sutera cephalotes Hiern, accepted as Chaenostoma aethiopicum (L.) Benth.
- Sutera cephalotes Hiern var. glabrata Hiern, accepted as Chaenostoma aethiopicum (L.) Benth.
- Sutera cinerea Hilliard, accepted as Chaenostoma cinereum (Hilliard) Kornhall, endemic
- Sutera compta Hiern, accepted as Chaenostoma floribundum Benth. present
- Sutera comptonii Hilliard, accepted as Chaenostoma comptonii (Hilliard) Kornhall, endemic
- Sutera concinna Hiern, accepted as Jamesbrittenia concinna (Hiern) Hilliard
- Sutera cooperi Hiern, indigenous
- Sutera cordata (Thunb.) Kuntze, accepted as Chaenostoma cordatum (Thunb.) Benth. endemic
- Sutera cordata (Thunb.) Kuntze var. hirsutior Hiern, accepted as Sutera cooperi Hiern, present
- Sutera corymbosa (Marloth & Engl.) Hiern, accepted as Camptoloma rotundifolium Benth.
- Sutera crassicaulis (Benth.) Hiern, accepted as Jamesbrittenia crassicaulis (Benth.) Hilliard, present
- Sutera cuneata (Benth.) Kuntze, accepted as Chaenostoma hispidum (Thunb.) Benth.
- Sutera cymulosa Hiern, accepted as Sutera cooperi Hiern, present
- Sutera debilis Hutch. accepted as Chaenostoma debile (Hutch.) Kornhall, indigenous
- Sutera decipiens Hilliard, accepted as Chaenostoma decipiens (Hilliard) Kornhall, endemic
- Sutera densifolia Hiern, accepted as Jamesbrittenia microphylla (L.f.) Hilliard, present
- Sutera dentatisepala Overkott, accepted as Jamesbrittenia dentatisepala (Overkott) Hilliard, present
- Sutera denudata (Benth.) Kuntze, accepted as Chaenostoma denudatum Benth. endemic
- Sutera divaricata (Diels) Hiern, accepted as Manulea annua (Hiern) Hilliard, present
- Sutera elegantissima (Schinz) Skan, accepted as Jamesbrittenia elegantissima (Schinz) Hilliard
- Sutera esculenta Bond, accepted as Jamesbrittenia incisa (Thunb.) Hilliard, present
- Sutera fastigiata (Benth.) Druce, accepted as Chaenostoma aethiopicum (L.) Benth. present
- Sutera filicaulis (Benth.) Hiern, accepted as Jamesbrittenia filicaulis (Benth.) Hilliard, present
- Sutera flexuosa Hiern, accepted as Jamesbrittenia tenella (Hiern) Hilliard, present
- Sutera floribunda (Benth.) Kuntze, accepted as Chaenostoma floribundum Benth. indigenous
- Sutera foetida Roth, endemic
- Sutera foliolosa (Benth.) Hiern, accepted as Jamesbrittenia foliolosa (Benth.) Hilliard, present
- Sutera fragilis Pilg. accepted as Jamesbrittenia fragilis (Pilg.) Hilliard
- Sutera fraterna Hiern, accepted as Jamesbrittenia thunbergii (G.Don) Hilliard, present
- Sutera fruticosa (Benth.) Hiern, accepted as Jamesbrittenia fruticosa (Benth.) Hilliard, present
- Sutera glabrata (Benth.) Kuntze, accepted as Chaenostoma glabratum Benth. endemic
- Sutera glandulifera Hilliard, accepted as Chaenostoma glanduliferum (Hilliard) Kornhall, endemic
- Sutera gracilis (Diels) Hiern, accepted as Jamesbrittenia thunbergii (G.Don) Hilliard, present
- Sutera grandiflora (Galpin) Hiern, accepted as Jamesbrittenia grandiflora (Galpin) Hilliard, present
- Sutera griquensis Hiern, endemic
- Sutera halimifolia (Benth.) Kuntze, accepted as Chaenostoma halimifolium Benth. indigenous
- Sutera henrici Hiern, accepted as Jamesbrittenia filicaulis (Benth.) Hilliard, present
- Sutera hereroensis (Engl.) Skan, accepted as Jamesbrittenia hereroensis (Engl.) Hilliard
- Sutera hispida (Thunb.) Druce, accepted as Chaenostoma hispidum (Thunb.) Benth. endemic
- Sutera humifusa Hiern, accepted as Chaenostoma platysepalum (Hiern) Kornhall, present
- Sutera impedita Hilliard, accepted as Chaenostoma impeditum (Hilliard) Kornhall, endemic
- Sutera incisa (Thunb.) Hiern, accepted as Jamesbrittenia incisa (Thunb.) Hilliard, present
- Sutera infundibiliformis Schinz, accepted as Chaenostoma polyanthum Benth. present
- Sutera integerrima (Benth.) Hiern, accepted as Jamesbrittenia integerrima (Benth.) Hilliard, present
- Sutera integrifolia (L.f.) Kuntze, accepted as Chaenostoma integrifolium (L.f.) Benth. endemic
- Sutera integrifolia (L.f.) Kuntze var. parvifolia Hiern, accepted as Chaenostoma hispidum (Thunb.) Benth. present
- Sutera intertexta Hiern, accepted as Chaenostoma campanulatum Benth. present
- Sutera jurassica Hilliard & B.L.Burtt, accepted as Jamesbrittenia jurassica (Hilliard & B.L.Burtt) Hilliard
- Sutera kraussiana (Bernh.) Hiern, accepted as Jamesbrittenia kraussiana (Bernh.) Hilliard, present
- Sutera langebergensis Hilliard, accepted as Chaenostoma langebergense (Hilliard) Kornhall, endemic
- Sutera latifolia Hiern, accepted as Sutera cooperi Hiern, present
- Sutera laxiflora (Benth.) Kuntze, accepted as Chaenostoma halimifolium Benth. present
- Sutera levis Hiern, accepted as Chaenostoma leve (Hiern) Kornhall, indigenous
- Sutera linifolia (Thunb.) Kuntze, accepted as Chaenostoma uncinatum (Desr.) Kornhall
- Sutera longipedicellata Hilliard, accepted as Chaenostoma longipedicellatum (Hilliard) Kornhall, endemic
- Sutera lychnidea (L.) Hiern, accepted as Lyperia lychnidea (L.) Druce, present
- Sutera lyperioides (Engl.) Engl. ex Range, accepted as Jamesbrittenia lyperioides (Engl.) Hilliard
- Sutera macleana Hiern, accepted as Chaenostoma floribundum Benth. present
- Sutera macrantha Codd, accepted as Jamesbrittenia macrantha (Codd) Hilliard, present
- Sutera macrosiphon (Schltr.) Hiern, accepted as Chaenostoma macrosiphon Schltr. endemic
- Sutera marifolia (Benth.) Kuntze, accepted as Chaenostoma marifolium Benth. endemic
- Sutera maritima Hiern, accepted as Jamesbrittenia maritima (Hiern) Hilliard, present
- Sutera maxii Hiern, accepted as Jamesbrittenia maxii (Hiern) Hilliard, present
- Sutera merxmuelleri Roessler, accepted as Jamesbrittenia merxmuelleri (Roessler) Hilliard
- Sutera micrantha (Klotzsch) Hiern, accepted as Jamesbrittenia micrantha (Klotzsch) Hilliard, present
- Sutera microphylla (L.f.) Hiern, accepted as Jamesbrittenia microphylla (L.f.) Hilliard, present
- Sutera mollis (Benth.) Hiern, accepted as Jamesbrittenia pinnatifida (L.f.) Hilliard, present
- Sutera montana (Diels) S.Moore, accepted as Jamesbrittenia montana (Diels) Hilliard, present
- Sutera multiramosa Hilliard, accepted as Chaenostoma multiramosum (Hilliard) Kornhall, endemic
- Sutera natalensis (Bernh.) Kuntze, accepted as Chaenostoma floribundum Benth. present
- Sutera neglecta (J.M.Wood & M.S.Evans) Hiern, accepted as Chaenostoma neglectum J.M.Wood & M.S.Evans, indigenous
- Sutera noodsbergensis Hiern, accepted as Chaenostoma floribundum Benth. present
- Sutera ochracea Hiern, accepted as Lyperia antirrhinoides (L.f.) Hilliard, present
- Sutera oppositiflora (Vent.) Kuntze, accepted as Chaenostoma hispidum (Thunb.) Benth.
- Sutera pallescens Hiern, accepted as Chaenostoma platysepalum (Hiern) Kornhall, present
- Sutera pallida (Pilg.) Overkott ex Roessler, accepted as Jamesbrittenia pallida (Pilg.) Hilliard
- Sutera palustris Hiern, accepted as Chaenostoma leve (Hiern) Kornhall, present
- Sutera paniculata Hilliard, accepted as Chaenostoma paniculatum (Hilliard) Kornhall, endemic
- Sutera patriotica Hiern, accepted as Chaenostoma patrioticum (Hiern) Kornhall, indigenous
- Sutera pauciflora (Benth.) Kuntze, accepted as Chaenostoma pauciflorum Benth. endemic
- Sutera pedunculata (Andrews) Hiern, accepted as Jamesbrittenia argentea (L.f.) Hilliard, present
- Sutera pedunculosa (Benth.) Kuntze, accepted as Jamesbrittenia pedunculosa (Benth.) Hilliard, present
- Sutera phlogiflora (Benth.) Hiern, accepted as Jamesbrittenia phlogiflora (Benth.) Hilliard, present
- Sutera placida Hilliard, accepted as Chaenostoma placidum (Hilliard) Kornhall, endemic
- Sutera platysepala Hiern, accepted as Chaenostoma platysepalum (Hiern) Kornhall, endemic
- Sutera polelensis Hiern subsp. fraterna Hilliard, accepted as Chaenostoma polelense (Hiern) Kornhall subsp. fraterna (Hilliard) Kornhall, indigenous
- Sutera polelensis Hiern subsp. polelensis, accepted as Chaenostoma polelense (Hiern) Kornhall subsp. polelense, indigenous
- Sutera polyantha (Benth.) Kuntze, accepted as Chaenostoma polyanthum Benth. endemic
- Sutera polysepala Hiern, accepted as Chaenostoma calycinum Benth. present
- Sutera pristisepala Hiern, accepted as Jamesbrittenia pristisepala (Hiern) Hilliard, present
- Sutera procumbens (Benth.) Kuntze, accepted as Chaenostoma polyanthum Benth. present
- Sutera pulchra Norl. accepted as Chaenostoma floribundum Benth.
- Sutera pumila (Benth.) Kuntze, accepted as Chaenostoma halimifolium Benth.
- Sutera racemosa (Benth.) Kuntze, accepted as Chaenostoma racemosum Benth., endemic
- Sutera ramosissima Hiern, accepted as Jamesbrittenia ramosissima (Hiern) Hilliard, present
- Sutera revoluta (Thunb.) Kuntze, accepted as Chaenostoma revolutum (Thunb.) Benth. endemic
- Sutera rhombifolia Schinz, accepted as Jamesbrittenia argentea (L.f.) Hilliard, present
- Sutera roseoflava Hiern, accepted as Chaenostoma roseoflavum (Hiern) Kornhall, endemic
- Sutera rotundifolia (Benth.) Kuntze, accepted as Chaenostoma rotundifolium Benth. endemic
- Sutera sessilifolia (Diels) Hiern, accepted as Jamesbrittenia sessilifolia (Diels) Hilliard
- Sutera silenoides Hilliard, accepted as Jamesbrittenia silenoides (Hilliard) Hilliard, present
- Sutera squarrosa (Pilg.) Hiern ex Range, accepted as Jamesbrittenia integerrima (Benth.) Hilliard, present
- Sutera stenopetala (Diels) Hiern, accepted as Jamesbrittenia incisa (Thunb.) Hilliard, present
- Sutera stenophylla Hiern, accepted as Chaenostoma subnudum N.E.Br. present
- Sutera subnuda (N.E.Br.) Hiern, accepted as Chaenostoma subnudum N.E.Br. endemic
- Sutera subsessilis Hilliard, accepted as Chaenostoma subsessile (Hilliard) Kornhall, endemic
- Sutera subspicata (Benth.) Kuntze, accepted as Chaenostoma subspicatum Benth. endemic
- Sutera tenella Hiern, accepted as Jamesbrittenia tenella (Hiern) Hilliard, present
- Sutera tenuicaulis Hilliard, accepted as Chaenostoma tenuicaule (Hilliard) Kornhall, endemic
- Sutera tenuiflora (Benth.) Hiern, accepted as Lyperia tenuiflora Benth. present
- Sutera tenuifolia (Bernh.) Fourc. accepted as Jamesbrittenia tenuifolia (Bernh.) Hilliard, present
- Sutera tenuis Pilg. accepted as Jamesbrittenia concinna (Hiern) Hilliard
- Sutera titanophila Hilliard, accepted as Chaenostoma titanophilum (Hilliard) Kornhall, endemic
- Sutera tomentosa Hiern, accepted as Jamesbrittenia glutinosa (Benth.) Hilliard, present
- Sutera tortuosa (Benth.) Hiern, accepted as Jamesbrittenia tortuosa (Benth.) Hilliard, present
- Sutera tristis (L.f.) Hiern, accepted as Lyperia tristis (L.f.) Benth. present
- Sutera tysonii Hiern, accepted as Jamesbrittenia tysonii (Hiern) Hilliard, present
- Sutera uncinata (Desr.) Hilliard, accepted as Chaenostoma uncinatum (Desr.) Kornhall, endemic
- Sutera violacea (Schltr.) Hiern, accepted as Chaenostoma violaceum Schltr. endemic
- Sutera virgulosa Hiern, accepted as Jamesbrittenia filicaulis (Benth.) Hilliard, present

== Teedia ==
Genus Teedia:

- Teedia lucida (Sol.) Rudolphi, indigenous
- Teedia pubescens Burch. endemic

== Tetraselago ==
Genus Tetraselago:

- Tetraselago longituba (Rolfe) Hilliard & B.L.Burtt, indigenous
- Tetraselago natalensis (Rolfe) Junell, indigenous
- Tetraselago nelsonii (Rolfe) Hilliard & B.L.Burtt, endemic
- Tetraselago wilmsii (Rolfe) Hilliard & B.L.Burtt, endemic

== Trieenea ==
Genus Trieenea:

- Trieenea elsiae Hilliard, endemic
- Trieenea frigida Hilliard, endemic
- Trieenea glutinosa (Schltr.) Hilliard, endemic
- Trieenea lanciloba Hilliard, endemic
- Trieenea lasiocephala Hilliard, endemic
- Trieenea laxiflora Hilliard, endemic
- Trieenea longipedicellata Hilliard, endemic
- Trieenea occulta J.C.Manning & Goldblatt, endemic
- Trieenea schlechteri (Hiern) Hilliard, endemic
- Trieenea taylorii Hilliard, endemic

== Verbascum ==
Genus Verbascum:

- Verbascum blattaria L. not indigenous, naturalised
- Verbascum thapsus L. not indigenous, cultivated, naturalised, invasive
- Verbascum virgatum Stokes, not indigenous, naturalised, invasive

== Walafrida ==
Genus Walafrida:

- Walafrida albanensis (Schltr.) Rolfe, accepted as Selago recurva E.Mey. present
- Walafrida alopecuroides (Rolfe) Rolfe, accepted as Selago alopecuroides Rolfe
- Walafrida angolensis (Rolfe) Rolfe, accepted as Selago angolensis Rolfe
- Walafrida articulata (Thunb.) Rolfe, accepted as Selago articulata Thunb. present
- Walafrida basutica E.Phillips, accepted as Selago saxatilis E.Mey. present
- Walafrida ciliata (L.f.) Rolfe, accepted as Selago ciliata L.f. present
- Walafrida cinerea (L.f.) Rolfe, accepted as Selago cinerea L.f., present
- Walafrida congesta (Rolfe) Rolfe, accepted as Selago congesta Rolfe, present
- Walafrida crassifolia Rolfe, accepted as Selago crassifolia (Rolfe) Hilliard, present
- Walafrida decipiens (E.Mey.) Rolfe, accepted as Selago decipiens E.Mey. present
- Walafrida densiflora (Rolfe) Rolfe, accepted as Selago densiflora Rolfe, present
- Walafrida diffusa Rolfe, accepted as Selago linearis Rolfe, present
- Walafrida distans (E.Mey.) Rolfe, accepted as Selago distans E.Mey., present
- Walafrida geniculata (L.f.) Rolfe, accepted as Selago geniculata L.f. present
- Walafrida gracilis Rolfe, accepted as Selago gracilis (Rolfe) Hilliard, present
- Walafrida loganii Hutch. accepted as Selago rigida Rolfe, present
- Walafrida macowani Rolfe, accepted as Selago decipiens E.Mey. present
- Walafrida merxmuelleri Roessler, accepted as Selago divaricata L.f.
- Walafrida micrantha (Choisy) Rolfe, accepted as Selago paniculata Thunb. present
- Walafrida myrtifolia (Rchb.) Rolfe, accepted as Selago myrtifolia Rchb. present
- Walafrida nachtigalii (Rolfe) Rolfe, accepted as Selago nachtigalii Rolfe, present
- Walafrida nitida E.Mey. accepted as Selago myrtifolia Rchb. present
- Walafrida paniculata (Thunb.) Rolfe, accepted as Selago paniculata Thunb. present
- Walafrida polycephala (Otto ex Walp.) Rolfe, accepted as Selago polycephala Otto ex Walp. present
- Walafrida polystachya Rolfe, accepted as Selago densiflora Rolfe, present
- Walafrida polystachya Rolfe, accepted as Selago multispicata Hilliard
- Walafrida pubescens Rolfe, accepted as Selago gracilis (Rolfe) Hilliard, present
- Walafrida recurva (E.Mey.) Rolfe, accepted as Selago recurva E.Mey. present
- Walafrida rigida (Rolfe) Hutch. accepted as Selago rigida Rolfe, present
- Walafrida rotundifolia (L.f.) Rolfe, accepted as Selago rotundifolia L.f. present
- Walafrida saxatilis (E.Mey.) Rolfe, accepted as Selago saxatilis E.Mey. present
- Walafrida schinzii Rolfe, accepted as Selago alopecuroides Rolfe
- Walafrida squarrosa Rolfe, accepted as Selago gracilis (Rolfe) Hilliard, present
- Walafrida tenuifolia Rolfe, accepted as Selago tenuifolia (Rolfe) Hilliard, present
- Walafrida witbergensis (E.Mey.) Rolfe, accepted as Selago witbergensis E.Mey. present
- Walafrida zeyheri (Choisy) Rolfe, accepted as Selago zeyheri Choisy, present
- Walafrida zuurbergensis Rolfe, accepted as Selago zeyheri Choisy, present

== Zaluzianskya ==
Genus Zaluzianskya:

- Zaluzianskya acrobareia Hilliard, endemic
- Zaluzianskya acutiloba Hilliard, endemic
- Zaluzianskya affinis Hilliard, endemic
- Zaluzianskya africana Hiern, accepted as Zaluzianskya pumila (Benth.) Walp. present
- Zaluzianskya angustifolia Hilliard & B.L.Burtt, endemic
- Zaluzianskya aschersoniana Schinz, accepted as Zaluzianskya benthamiana Walp. present
- Zaluzianskya bella Hilliard, endemic
- Zaluzianskya benthamiana Walp. indigenous
- Zaluzianskya capensis (L.) Walp. endemic
- Zaluzianskya chasmanthiflora (Hilliard) J.C.Manning & Goldblatt, endemic
- Zaluzianskya chrysops Hilliard & B.L.Burtt, indigenous
- Zaluzianskya cohabitans Hilliard, endemic
- Zaluzianskya collina Hiern, endemic
- Zaluzianskya crocea Schltr. indigenous
- Zaluzianskya diandra Diels, indigenous
- Zaluzianskya distans Hiern, endemic
- Zaluzianskya divaricata (Thunb.) Walp. endemic
- Zaluzianskya elongata Hilliard & B.L.Burtt, indigenous
- Zaluzianskya falciloba Diels, accepted as Zaluzianskya pumila (Benth.) Walp. present
- Zaluzianskya gilgiana Diels, accepted as Zaluzianskya violacea Schltr. present
- Zaluzianskya gilioides Schltr. accepted as Zaluzianskya peduncularis (Benth.) Walp. present
- Zaluzianskya glandulosa Hilliard, endemic
- Zaluzianskya glareosa Hilliard & B.L.Burtt, indigenous
- Zaluzianskya gracilis Hilliard, endemic
- Zaluzianskya inflata Diels, endemic
- Zaluzianskya isanthera Hilliard, endemic
- Zaluzianskya kareebergensis Hilliard, endemic
- Zaluzianskya karrooica Hilliard, endemic
- Zaluzianskya katharinae Hiern, endemic
- Zaluzianskya lanigera Hilliard, endemic
- Zaluzianskya maritima (L.f.) Walp. endemic
- Zaluzianskya marlothii Hilliard, endemic
- Zaluzianskya microsiphon (Kuntze) K.Schum. indigenous
- Zaluzianskya minima (Hiern) Hilliard, endemic
- Zaluzianskya mirabilis Hilliard, endemic
- Zaluzianskya muirii Hilliard & B.L.Burtt, endemic
- Zaluzianskya natalensis Bernh. indigenous
- Zaluzianskya nemesioides Diels, endemic
- Zaluzianskya ovata (Benth.) Walp. indigenous
- Zaluzianskya pachyrrhiza Hilliard & B.L.Burtt, endemic
- Zaluzianskya parviflora Hilliard, endemic
- Zaluzianskya peduncularis (Benth.) Walp. indigenous
- Zaluzianskya pilosa Hilliard & B.L.Burtt, endemic
- Zaluzianskya pilosissima Hilliard, endemic
- Zaluzianskya pulvinata Killick, indigenous
- Zaluzianskya pumila (Benth.) Walp. endemic
- Zaluzianskya pusilla (Benth.) Walp. endemic
- Zaluzianskya ramosa Schinz ex Hiern, accepted as Zaluzianskya benthamiana Walp. present
- Zaluzianskya regalis J.C.Manning & Goldblatt, endemic
- Zaluzianskya rubrostellata Hilliard & B.L.Burtt, indigenous
- Zaluzianskya sanorum Hilliard, endemic
- Zaluzianskya schmitziae Hilliard & B.L.Burtt, indigenous
- Zaluzianskya spathacea (Benth.) Walp. indigenous
- Zaluzianskya sutherlandica Hilliard, endemic
- Zaluzianskya synaptica Hilliard, endemic
- Zaluzianskya turritella Hilliard & B.L.Burtt, indigenous
- Zaluzianskya vallispiscis Hilliard, endemic
- Zaluzianskya venusta Hilliard, endemic
- Zaluzianskya villosa F.W.Schmidt, endemic
- Zaluzianskya violacea Schltr. endemic
