= Pikmin (disambiguation) =

Pikmin is a real-time strategy and puzzle video game series created by Nintendo.

Pikmin may also refer to:

- Pikmin (video game), the first game in the eponymous series; released in 2001 for the GameCube
- Pikmin (species), the fictional species the video game series centres around
- Bacopa Cabana, known in English as the Pikmin flower; a flower bred as a promotion for the video game
