= Sutera (plant) =

Scientific classification
- Kingdom: Plantae
- Clade: Embryophytes
- Clade: Tracheophytes
- Clade: Angiosperms
- Clade: Eudicots
- Clade: Asterids
- Order: Lamiales
- Family: Scrophulariaceae
- Tribe: Limoselleae
- Genus: Sutera; Roth

Species
- See text

Genus of flowering plants

Sutera is a genus of annual and perennial flowering plants and shrubs of the family Scrophulariaceae mainly confined to Africa.

== Taxonomy ==
Sutera cordata was named Manulea cordata in 1800 by Thunberg. Bentham renamed it Chaenostoma in 1836, Kuntze changed it to Sutera in 1891 on the grounds of synonymy. In 1994 Hilliard considered the two names subgenera of Sutera, but in 2005 Kornhall and Bremer separated the two again, placing S. cordata in Chaenostoma.

=== Species ===
As of July 2020, Plants of the World Online accepted the following species:

- Sutera brunnea Hiern
- Sutera burkeana (Benth.) Hiern
- Sutera cooperi Hiern
- Sutera foetida (Andrews) Roth
- Sutera griquensis Hiern

Formerly placed in this genus

- Sutera cordata → Chaenostoma cordatum
