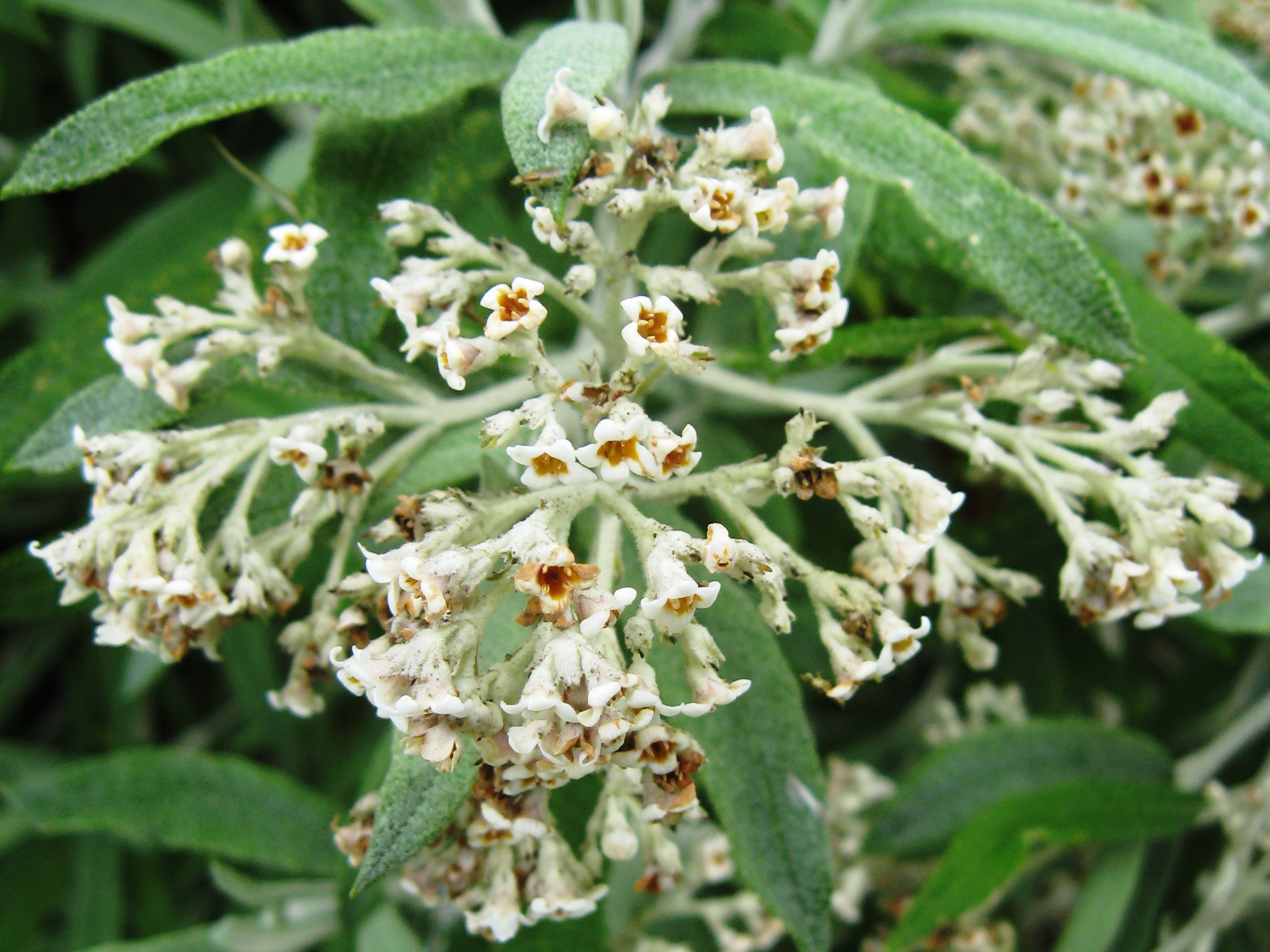
- Buddleja loricata flowers,

Scientific classification
- Kingdom: Plantae
- Clade: Embryophytes
- Clade: Tracheophytes
- Clade: Spermatophytes
- Clade: Angiosperms
- Clade: Eudicots
- Clade: Asterids
- Order: Lamiales
- Family: Scrophulariaceae
- Genus: Buddleja
- Species: B. loricata

Binomial name
- Buddleja loricata Leeuwenb.

Synonyms
- Chilianthus corrugatus Benth.; Buddleja corrugata (Benth.) Phillips; Nuxia corrugata Benth.

= Buddleja loricata =

Species of flowering plant

Buddleja loricata is a hardy evergreen shrub endemic to South Africa and Mozambique, where it grows on mountain slopes at elevations above 1,800 m. The shrub has only recently been introduced to cultivation in Europe.

== Description ==
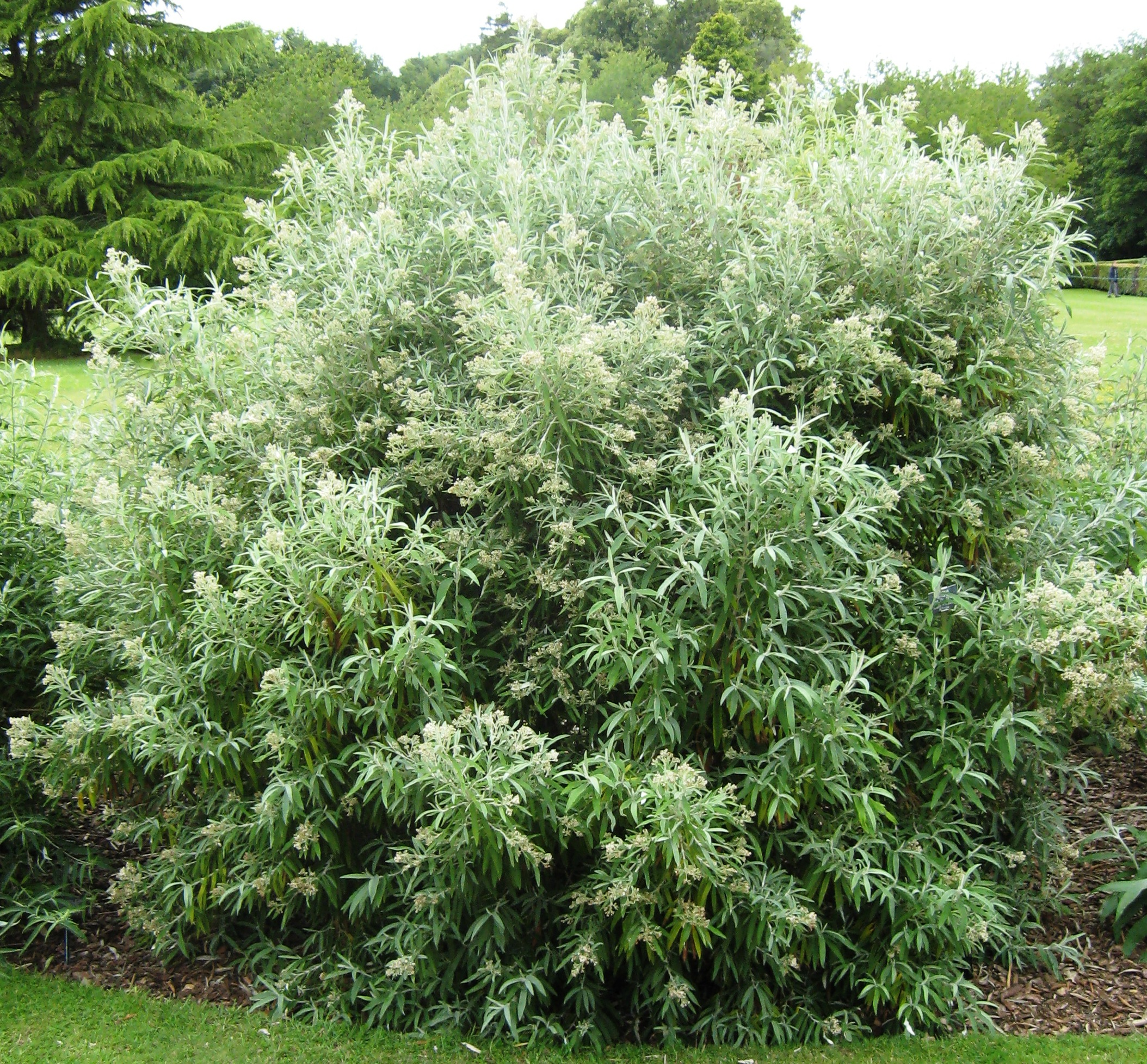
B. loricata, Longstock Park Nursery

Buddleja loricata makes a large, bushy shrub < 4 m in height. The leaves are opposite, narrowly oblong-elliptic, < 9 cm long by 2 cm wide, the wrinkled upper surfaces dark green. The honey-scented flowers are small, pale cream with a dull orange throat, borne in clustered terminal heads from mid-autumn to winter.

== Cultivation ==
Buddleja loricata is hardy in the UK, and considered easy to grow, being tolerant of heat, drought, and cold, and requiring very little pruning to maintain shape. The shrub features in the NCCPG National Collection of Buddleja held by the Longstock Park Nursery, near Stockbridge, England. Hardiness: USDA zones 7–9.

== Hybrids ==
The shrub was crossed with Buddleja crispa by Peter Moore, Longstock Park Nursery, to create the hybrid cultivar Silver Anniversary.
