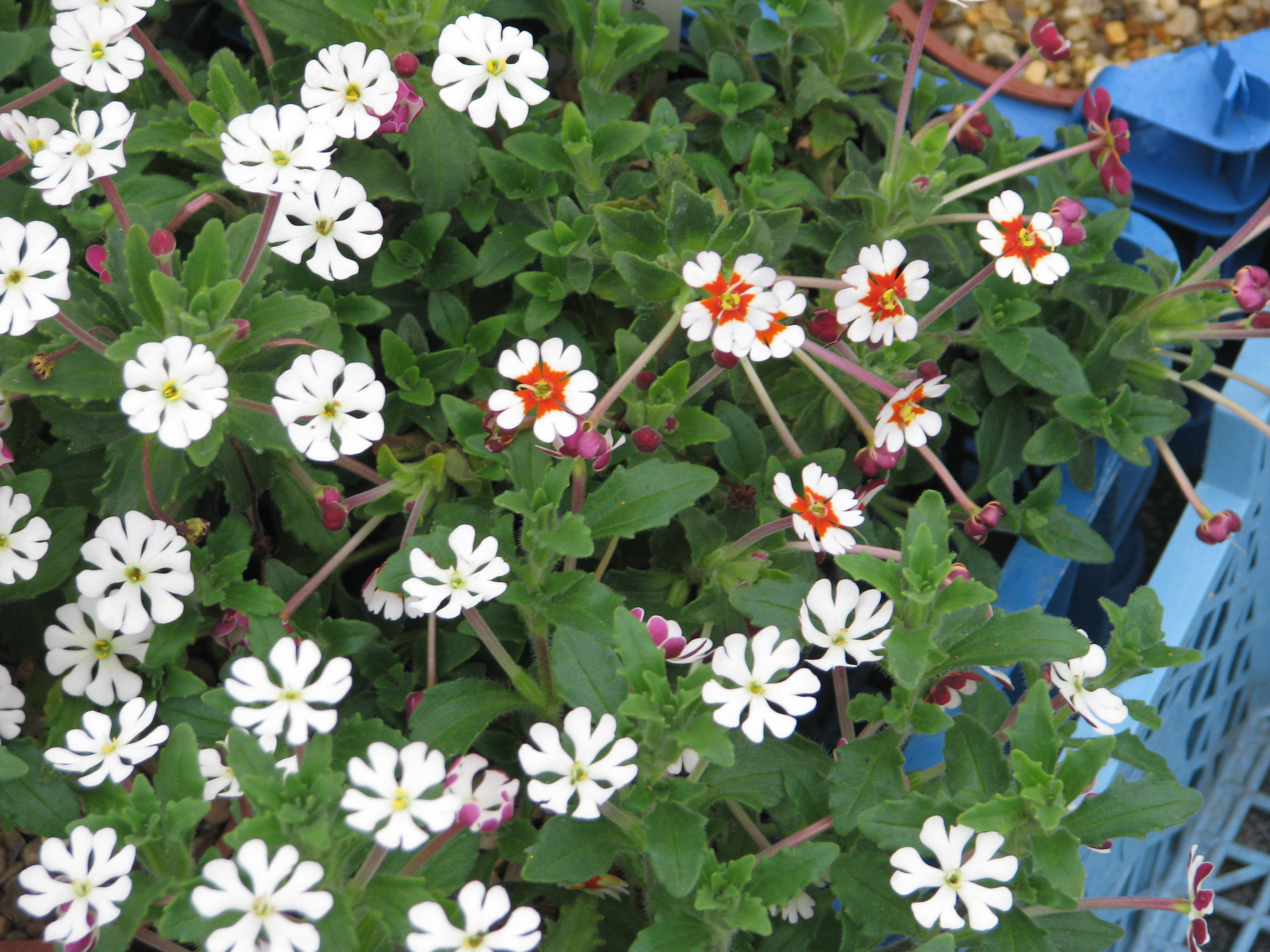
- Two forms

Scientific classification
- Kingdom: Plantae
- Clade: Tracheophytes
- Clade: Angiosperms
- Clade: Eudicots
- Clade: Asterids
- Order: Lamiales
- Family: Scrophulariaceae
- Genus: Zaluzianskya
- Species: Z. ovata

Binomial name
- Zaluzianskya ovata Walp.

= Zaluzianskya ovata =

Species of plant

Zaluzianskya ovata, the night scented phlox, is a species of flowering plant in the family Scrophulariaceae, native to Lesotho and South Africa (Cape Province, KwaZulu-Natal, Free State).

Growing to 50 cm (20 in) tall and broad, this short-lived evergreen perennial has slightly sticky leaves, and notched white daisy-like flowers with red backs. It is valued in cultivation for its intense fragrance, especially at night.

As it is not completely hardy it is often grown as a summer bedding plant to be discarded after flowering. It is a suitable subject for container growing, preferring a position in full sun.

It is not closely related to the true phloxes, nor to the plant known as night scented stock, Matthiola longipetala.
