= Antherothamnus =

Scientific classification
- Kingdom: Plantae
- Clade: Tracheophytes
- Clade: Angiosperms
- Clade: Eudicots
- Clade: Asterids
- Order: Lamiales
- Family: Scrophulariaceae
- Genus: Antherothamnus; N.E.Br. (1915)
- Species: A. pearsonii

Binomial name
- Antherothamnus pearsonii N.E.Br. (1915)

Synonyms
- Selaginastrum Schinz & Thell. (1929); Antherothamnus rigidus (L.Bolus) E.Phillips (1937); Manuleopsis karasmontana Dinter (1928); Selaginastrum karasmontanum (Dinter) Schinz & Thell. (1929); Selaginastrum rigidum (L.Bolus) Schinz & Thell. (1929); Sutera rigida L.Bolus (1915)

Genus of flowering plants

Antherothamnus pearsonii is a species of flowering plant belonging to the family Scrophulariaceae. It is the sole species in genus Antherothamnus.

It is a shrub native to deserts and dry shrublands in Zimbabwe, Botswana, Namibia, and the Northern Provinces of South Africa.
