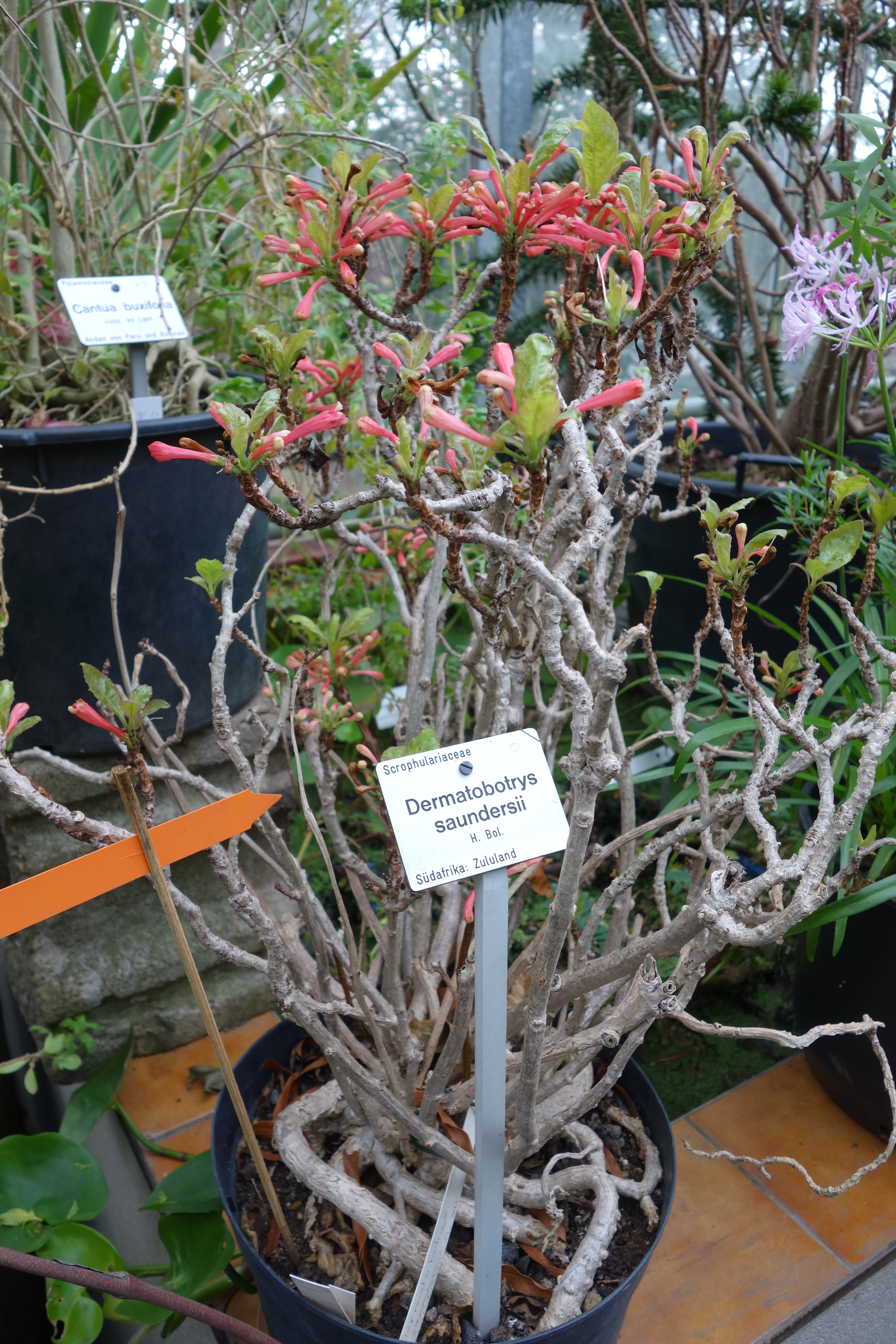

Scientific classification
- Kingdom: Plantae
- Clade: Tracheophytes
- Clade: Angiosperms
- Clade: Eudicots
- Clade: Asterids
- Order: Lamiales
- Family: Scrophulariaceae
- Tribe: Teedieae
- Genus: Dermatobotrys; Bolus
- Species: D. saundersii

Binomial name
- Dermatobotrys saundersii Bolus

= Dermatobotrys =

Genus of flowering plants

Dermatobotrys is a rare plant genus endemic to coastal scarp forests in Madagascar and from southern Zululand to the Transkei in South Africa. It consists of a single species, Dermatobotrys saundersii, which is an epiphytic, deciduous shrub, of up to 1 metre (3.3 ft) in height, growing on trees or occasionally on the forest floor. Its flowers are tubular and deep red, followed by smooth, brownish fruit.
