= Aptosimum marlothii =

Scientific classification
- Kingdom: Plantae
- Clade: Tracheophytes
- Clade: Angiosperms
- Clade: Eudicots
- Clade: Asterids
- Order: Lamiales
- Family: Scrophulariaceae
- Genus: Aptosimum
- Species: A. marlothii

Binomial name
- Aptosimum marlothii (Engl.) Hiern, 1904

Species of plant

Aptosimum marlothii is a species of flowering plant in the family Scrophulariaceae. It is native to Southern Africa and is widespread across its range.
