= Sutera griquensis =

Scientific classification
- Kingdom: Plantae
- Clade: Tracheophytes
- Clade: Angiosperms
- Clade: Eudicots
- Clade: Asterids
- Order: Lamiales
- Family: Scrophulariaceae
- Genus: Sutera
- Species: S. griquensis

Binomial name
- Sutera griquensis Hiern

Synonyms
- Sutera burchellii Hiern

South African plant species

Sutera griquensis is a species of plant from South Africa.

== Description ==
This coarse and bushy spreading herb grows to be up to 30 cm (12 in) tall. It is glandular and covered in fine, down-like hairs. The stems come woody with age and reach a diameter of up to 4 mm (0.16 in). The oval-shaped leaves are typically alternately arranged, although they may sometimes be oppositely arranged. The stalk is often nearly as long as the blade. The bases are not connate. The margins are coarsely toothed and the larger teeth may themselves be sparingly toothed.

While the flowering season has proven difficult to determine precisely, it seems to flower after it has rained. The flowers have white or rarely mauve corolla lobes and a yellow or orange tube. Inflorescences may be solitary or held in tree flowered cymules in the upper axils. They are arranged in loose panicles or in racemes. The calyx is bilabiate. The corlolla tube is cylindrical, broasening very slightly towards the top.

== Distribution and habitat ==
This species is endemic to South Africa and is known from the Northern Cape, North West and Free State provinces. It is best known from the Griqualand West area. It prefers growing in the shelter provided by cliffs and rocky outcrops.

== Conservation ==
This species is classified as being of least concern.
