= Peliostomum leucorrhizum =

Scientific classification
- Kingdom: Plantae
- Clade: Tracheophytes
- Clade: Angiosperms
- Clade: Eudicots
- Clade: Asterids
- Order: Lamiales
- Family: Scrophulariaceae
- Genus: Peliostomum
- Species: P. leucorrhizum

Binomial name
- Peliostomum leucorrhizum E. Mey. ex Benth., 1836

Species of plant

Peliostomum leucorrhizum, the veld violet, is a perennial herb native to Southern Africa. It is a much-branched, rigid plant that can grow up to 250 mm high, though it is sometimes prostrate.
