= Selago luxurians =

Scientific classification
- Kingdom: Plantae
- Clade: Tracheophytes
- Clade: Angiosperms
- Clade: Eudicots
- Clade: Asterids
- Order: Lamiales
- Family: Scrophulariaceae
- Genus: Selago
- Species: S. luxurians

Binomial name
- Selago luxurians Choisy

Species of flowering plant

Selago luxurians is a species of plant in the family Scrophulariaceae. It is indigenous to the southern Cape region of South Africa. It occurs from Riversdale in the west, as far east as Port Elizabeth, and as far inland as the Swartberg mountains.
