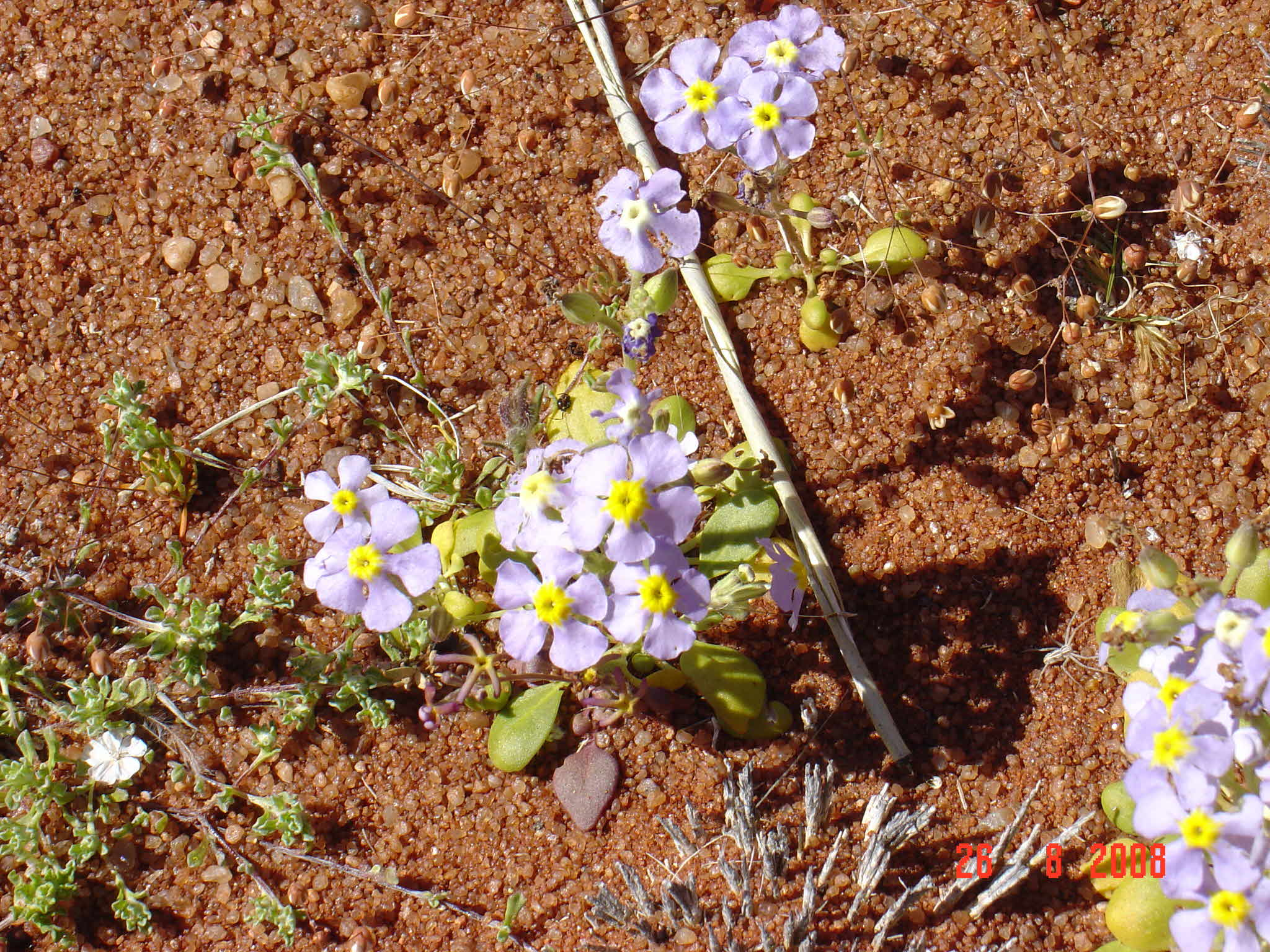
- Zaluzianskya sp.

Scientific classification
- Kingdom: Plantae
- Clade: Tracheophytes
- Clade: Angiosperms
- Clade: Eudicots
- Clade: Asterids
- Order: Lamiales
- Family: Scrophulariaceae
- Tribe: Limoselleae
- Genus: Zaluzianskya; F.W.Schmidt

Species
- See text

= Zaluzianskya =

Genus of flowering plant

Zaluzianskya is a genus of flowering plants now regarded as a member of the Scrophulariaceae, the figwort family. The genus is endemic to Southern Africa and includes some described sixty species.

== Taxonomy ==
Zaluzianskya was named in honour of Adam Zalužanský ze Zalužan, 1558–1613, a physician of Prague, author of Methodus Herbariae, 1592. Zaluziansky seems to have been a deservedly prominent botanist in his day, with some views on taxonomy quite advanced for his time.

== Pollinators ==
Superficially the shape of the flowers is strikingly phlox-like, hence the designation 'night phlox', for their evening fragrance. The fragrance after dark suggests that in nature the species in question are pollinated by moths, whereas day-pollinated species often have little or no obvious scent. Research is in progress on the ecological and evolutionary relationships between some members of the genus and specialist long-tongued pollinators, particularly night flying hawk moths (family Sphingidae) and flies in the families Nemestrinidae, Tabanidae, and Bombyliidae. Day-flying hawk moths, such as the genus Macroglossum (hummingbird hawk moths) also seem to be significant pollinators of many species of Zaluzianskya.

== Cultivation ==
Zaluzianskya species have not been of horticultural significance until recently. Zaluzianskya rubrostellata is cultivated as an annual herbaceous ornamental plant.

== Species ==
Species include

- Zaluzianskya affinis
- Zaluzianskya capensis
- Zaluzianskya divaricata (spreading night phlox)
- Zaluzianskya ovata
- Zaluzianskya lychnidea (windowphlox)
- Zaluzianskya microsiphon
- Zaluzianskya pulvinata
- Zaluzianskya pumila
- Zaluzianskya rubrostellata (night phlox)
- Zaluzianskya villosa (southern lilac drumsticks, blue drumsticks)
- Zaluzianskya spathacea

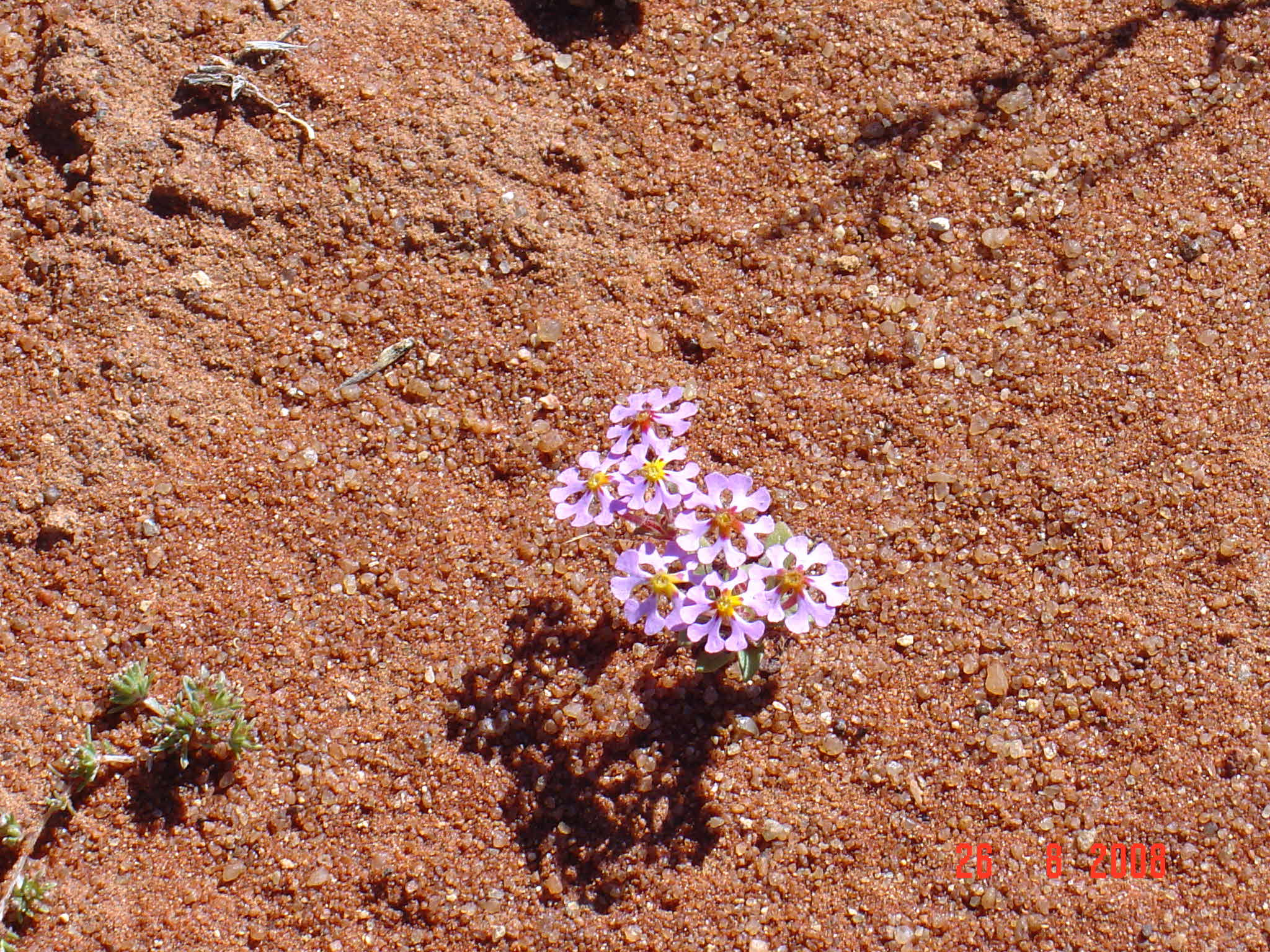
Zaluzianskya spp.
