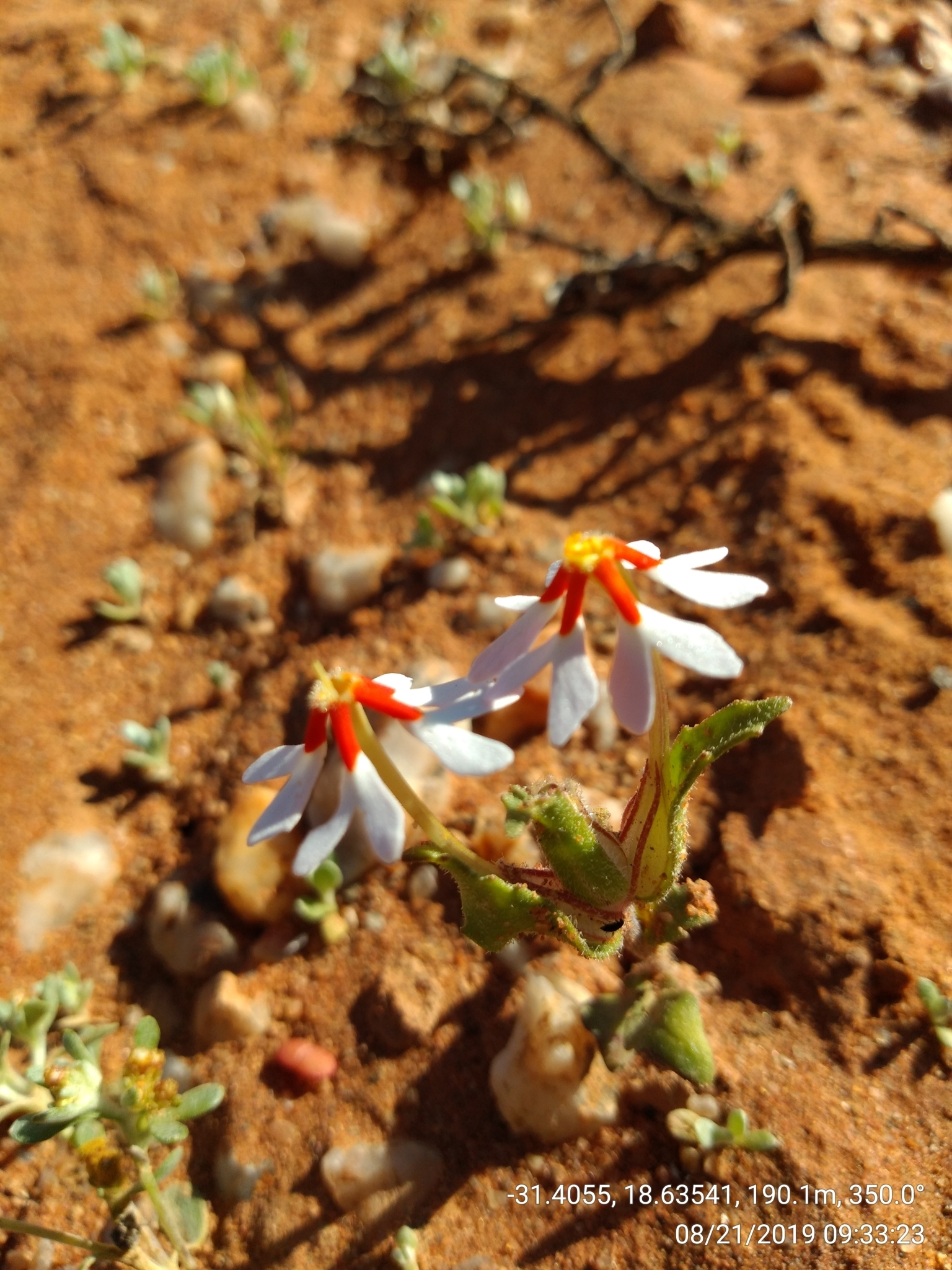

Conservation status
- Least Concern (SANBI Red List)

Scientific classification
- Kingdom: Plantae
- Clade: Tracheophytes
- Clade: Angiosperms
- Clade: Eudicots
- Clade: Asterids
- Order: Lamiales
- Family: Scrophulariaceae
- Genus: Zaluzianskya
- Species: Z. pumila

Binomial name
- Zaluzianskya pumila (Benth.) Walp.

Synonyms
- Erinus africanus Thunb.; Zaluzianskya africana Hiern; Zaluzianskya falciloba Diels; Zaluzianskya pseudafricana Paclt

= Zaluzianskya pumila =

Flowering plant endemic to the Cape Provinces

Zaluzianskya pumila is a species of flowering plant in the genus Zaluzianskya. It is endemic to the Northern Cape and Western Cape.

== Conservation status ==
Zaluzianskya pumila is classified as Least Concern as the population is stable.
