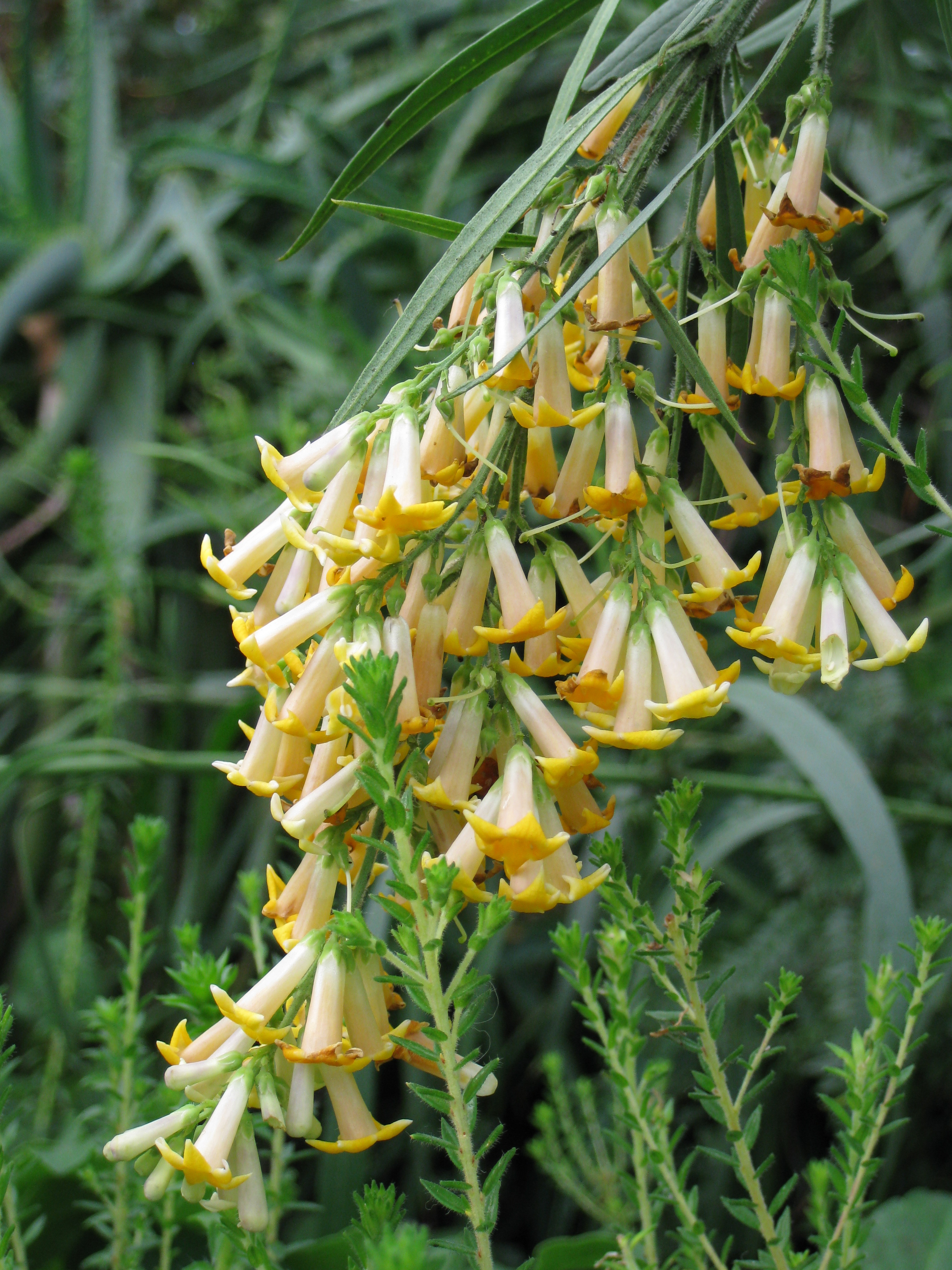
- Flowers of Freylinia lanceolata in the Mediterranean Biome at the Eden Project

Scientific classification
- Kingdom: Plantae
- Clade: Tracheophytes
- Clade: Angiosperms
- Clade: Eudicots
- Clade: Asterids
- Order: Lamiales
- Family: Scrophulariaceae
- Genus: Freylinia
- Species: F. lanceolata

Binomial name
- Freylinia lanceolata (L.f.) G.Don

= Freylinia lanceolata =

Species of shrub

Freylinia lanceolata is a South African shrub belonging to the family Scrophulariaceae.

This species prefers damp ground, riverbanks and marshy areas in the Western Cape, through to the Eastern Cape.
