= Selago glomerata =

Scientific classification
- Kingdom: Plantae
- Clade: Tracheophytes
- Clade: Angiosperms
- Clade: Eudicots
- Clade: Asterids
- Order: Lamiales
- Family: Scrophulariaceae
- Genus: Selago
- Species: S. glomerata

Binomial name
- Selago glomerata Thunb.

Species of flowering plant

Selago glomerata is a species of plant in the family Scrophulariaceae. It is indigenous to the southern Cape coastal region of South Africa. It occurs from George in the west, as far east as Algoa bay, and as far inland as the Outeniqua, Kouga and Baviaanskloof mountains. This species has white flowers, that often fade to a pale purple colour when dry.
