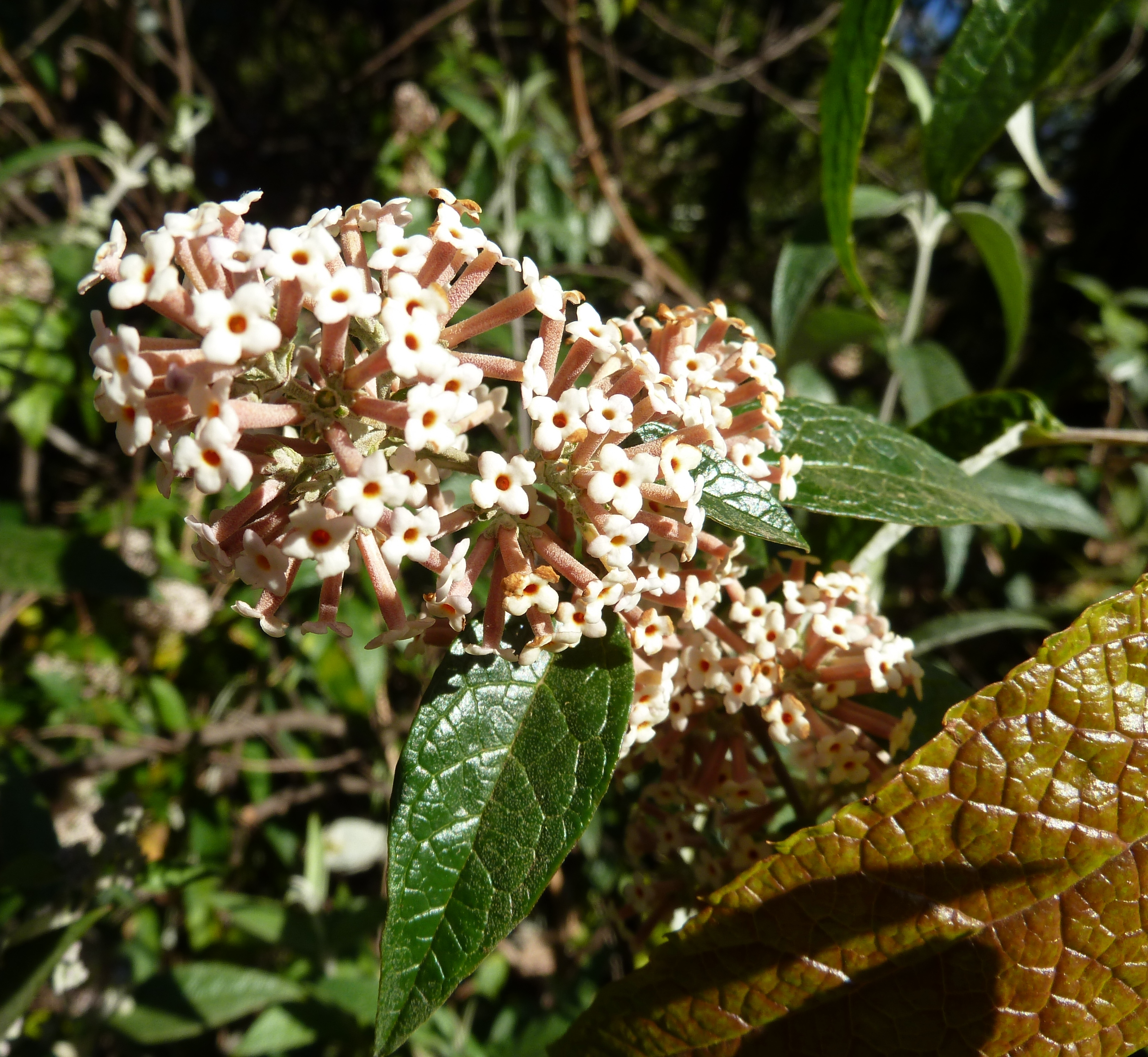
- Inflorescence

Scientific classification
- Kingdom: Plantae
- Clade: Embryophytes
- Clade: Tracheophytes
- Clade: Spermatophytes
- Clade: Angiosperms
- Clade: Eudicots
- Clade: Asterids
- Order: Lamiales
- Family: Scrophulariaceae
- Genus: Buddleja
- Species: B. auriculata

Binomial name
- Buddleja auriculata Benth.

Synonyms
- Buddleja auriculata var. euryifolia Prain

= Buddleja auriculata =

Species of flowering plant

Buddleja auriculata is an evergreen shrub endemic to Zimbabwe, Mozambique, and South Africa, growing in montane fields and thickets at elevations of 600–2,000 m. First collected by W. J. Burchell in 1813, and named by Bentham, the date of its introduction to western cultivation is not known, however it was accorded the Royal Horticultural Society Award of Merit in 1923.

== Description ==
Buddleja auriculata makes a large shrub up to 6 m in height, flowering in the Northern Hemisphere from October to December. The leaves are narrow, lanceolate, and dark green, contrasting strongly with the inflorescences, comprising small, loose, off-white panicles, the corollas with yellow throats, and exuding a scent once compared with Chanel No. 5.

== Cultivation ==
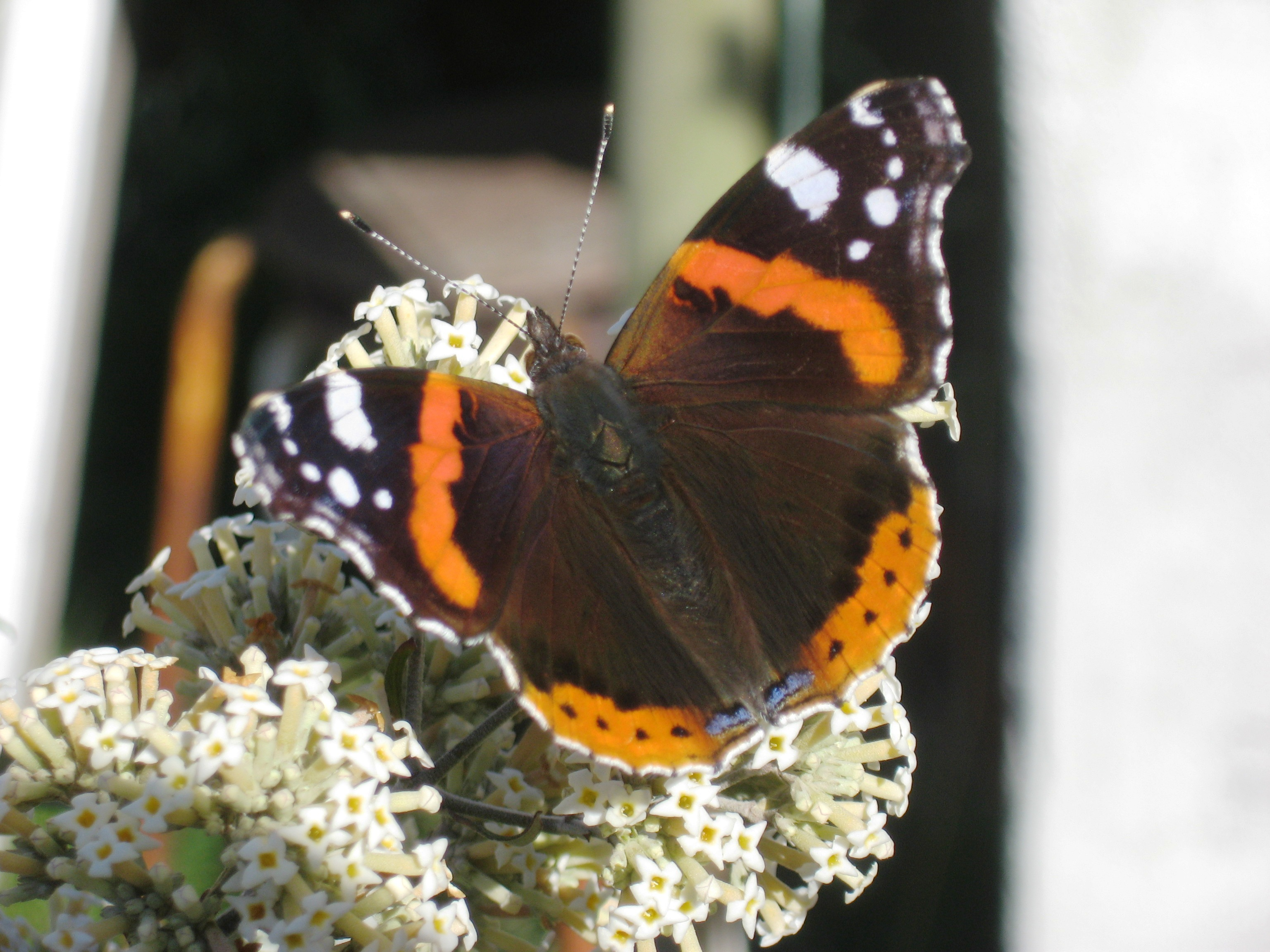
Red Admiral

Buddleja auriculata is not hardy below c. −10 °C and best grown against a south-facing wall in temperate climates. In the UK, the shrub is often planted as a source of nectar for red admiral butterflies still on the wing in late autumn. The plant features in the NCCPG National Collection of Buddleja held by the Longstock Park Nursery, near Stockbridge, although the large specimen there was killed during the winter of 2010–11, when temperatures fell to −12 °C. The shrub can be pruned lightly to maintain shape each year in spring after flowering. Propagation from cuttings can be difficult. Hardiness: USDA zones 9–10.
