= Peliostomum junceum =

Scientific classification
- Kingdom: Plantae
- Clade: Tracheophytes
- Clade: Angiosperms
- Clade: Eudicots
- Clade: Asterids
- Order: Lamiales
- Family: Scrophulariaceae
- Genus: Peliostomum
- Species: P. junceum

Binomial name
- Peliostomum junceum (Hiern) Kolberg & van Slageren

Species of plant

Peliostomum junceum is a species of flowering plant in the family Scrophulariaceae, native to Southern Africa.
