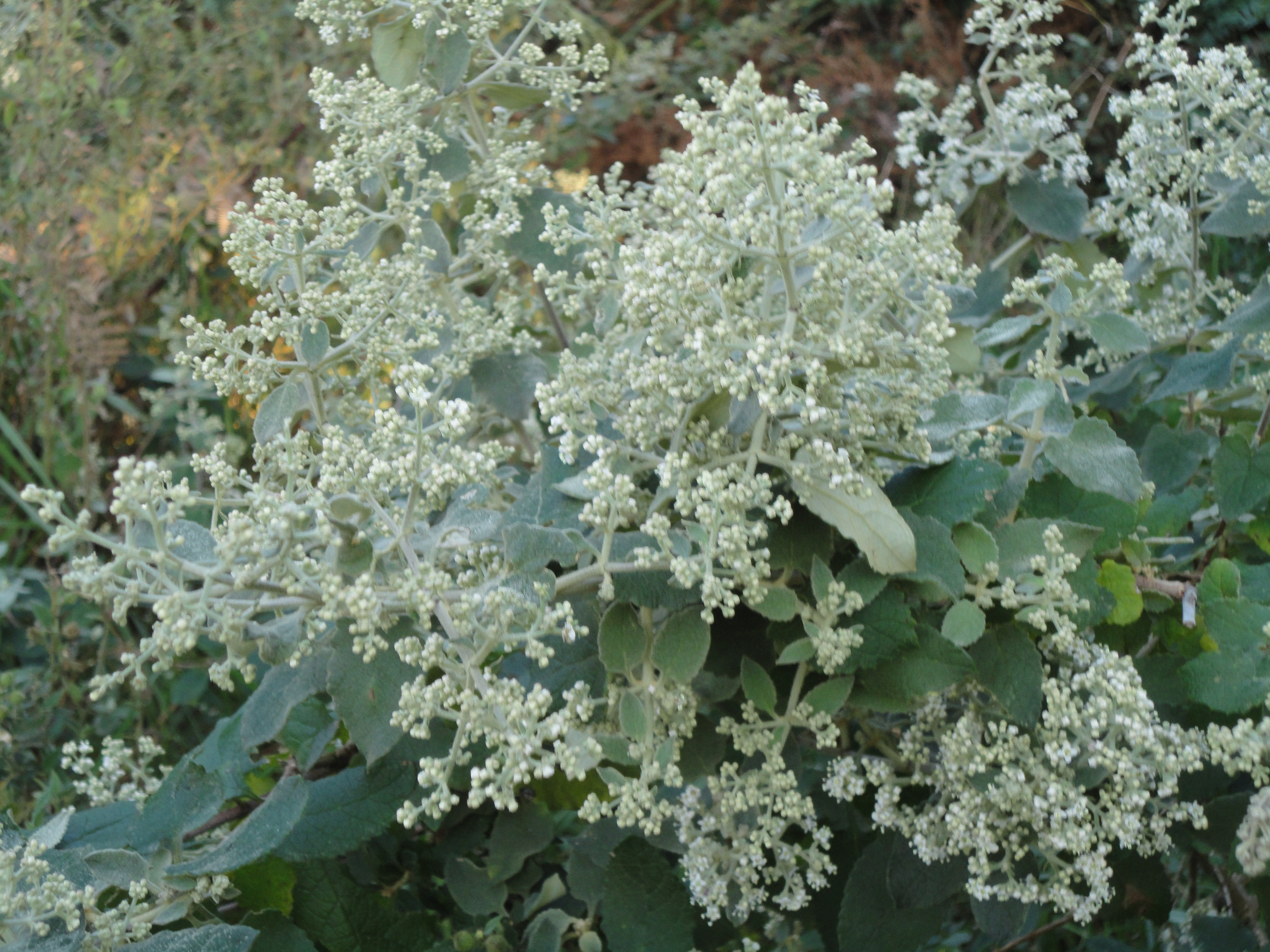
- Buddleja dysophylla in South Africa

Scientific classification
- Kingdom: Plantae
- Clade: Embryophytes
- Clade: Tracheophytes
- Clade: Spermatophytes
- Clade: Angiosperms
- Clade: Eudicots
- Clade: Asterids
- Order: Lamiales
- Family: Scrophulariaceae
- Genus: Buddleja
- Species: B. dysophylla

Binomial name
- Buddleja dysophylla (Benth.) Radlkofer

Synonyms
- Chilanthus dysophyllus (Benth.) A. D. C.; Chilanthus dysophyllus var. rufescens Sond.; Nuxia dysophylla Benth.

= Buddleja dysophylla =

Species of flowering plant

Buddleja dysophylla is a species endemic to southern Africa, from Zaire and Tanzania south to Malawi, and from the Transvaal to Eastern Cape Province, where it grows along forest edges or in scrub at elevations of 0–2,600 m. The species was named and described in 1883 by Radlkofer.

== Description ==
Buddleja dysophylla is a straggling or scandent shrub, only erect if isolated, 1–10 m in height, with divaricate branching. The densely tomentose branchlets are terete to quadrangular, bearing opposite, petiolate leaves, triangular to ovate, 1–10 cm long by 0.7–7.5 cm wide, acuminate to rounded at the apex, decurrent into the petiole; the margins irregularly serrate–dentate to crenate–dentate. The lax terminal inflorescences are paniculate, 4–20 cm long by 4–20 cm wide. The corollas 2.5–5 mm long, the colour white, cream, or mauve.

== Cultivation ==
Buddleja dysophylla is only known to be in cultivation in Australia, at Longueville, and at the City Botanic Gardens, where it flowers in August. It has also naturalized in the states of Western Australia, South Australia, Victoria and New South Wales.
