= Selago eckloniana =

Scientific classification
- Kingdom: Plantae
- Clade: Tracheophytes
- Clade: Angiosperms
- Clade: Eudicots
- Clade: Asterids
- Order: Lamiales
- Family: Scrophulariaceae
- Genus: Selago
- Species: S. eckloniana

Binomial name
- Selago eckloniana Choisy

Synonyms
- Selago elata Choisy

Species of flowering plant

Selago eckloniana is a species of plant in the family Scrophulariaceae. It is endemic to the Western Cape, South Africa.

== Description ==
Selago eckloniana can be distinguished from other related Selago species by the short hairs that cover its stems (often arranged in longitudinal lines). Its slender-linear leaves are concave-channelled along the basal portion of their upper (adaxial) faces.

The flowers are internally glandular, born on short pedicels, and enclosed basally by lanceolate bracts. The bracts of all but the lowest flowers are constricted basally to enclose the pedicel-base.

Several related species are easily confused with S. eckloniana. However, Selago trichopylla has leaves that are hairy, while Selago marlothii has wider bracts, leaves that are nearly terete (unifacial), and racemes that are significantly shorter.

== Distribution ==
It is restricted to the arid Little Karoo region of the Western Cape, South Africa, where it grows in succulent karoo and renosterveld vegetation, on rocky slopes and hills.

Its distribution extends from Robertson in the west, to Uniondale in the east.
