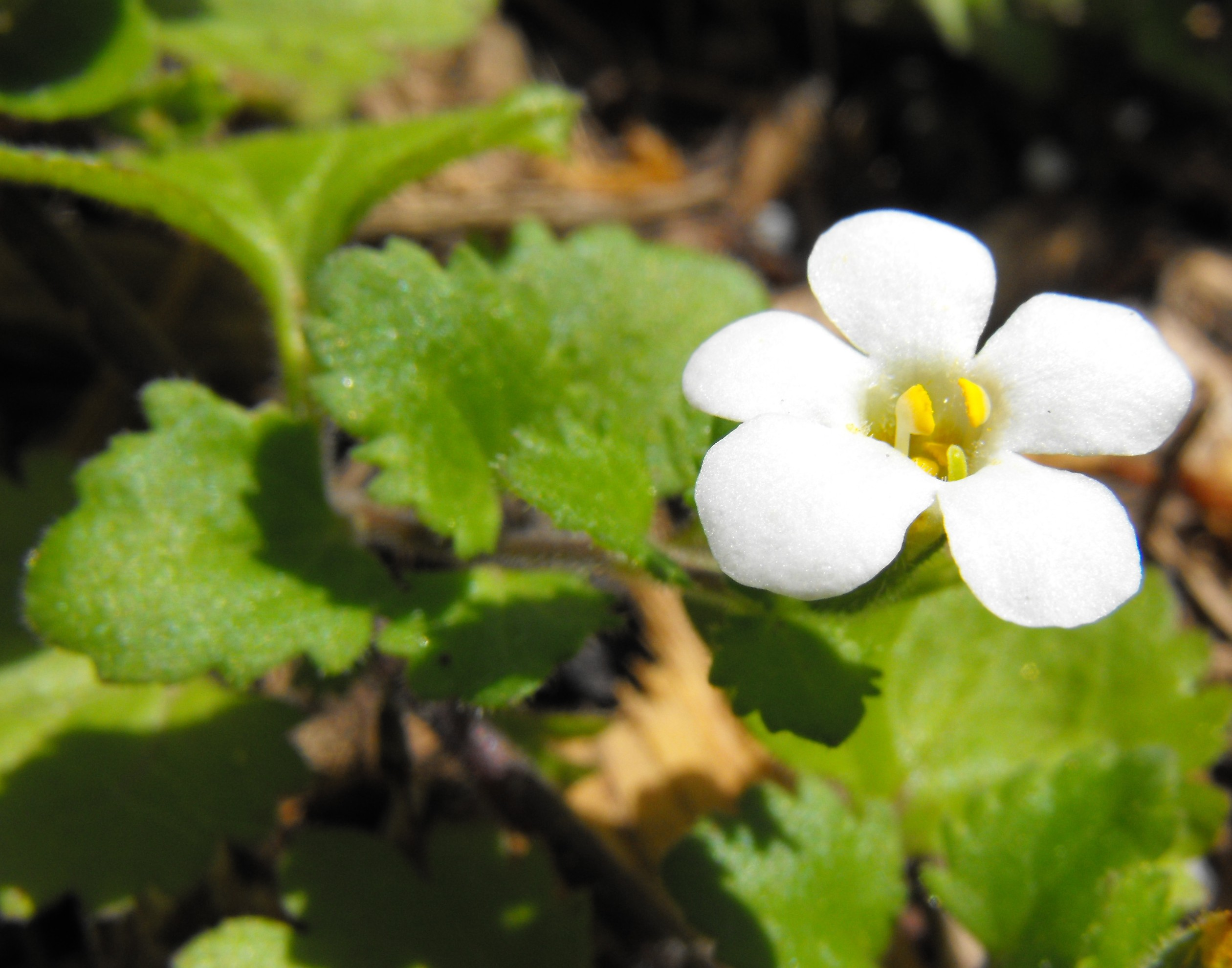
- Chaenostoma cordatum 'Snowflake'

Scientific classification
- Kingdom: Plantae
- Clade: Embryophytes
- Clade: Tracheophytes
- Clade: Spermatophytes
- Clade: Angiosperms
- Clade: Eudicots
- Clade: Asterids
- Order: Lamiales
- Family: Scrophulariaceae
- Genus: Chaenostoma
- Species: C. cordatum

Binomial name
- Chaenostoma cordatum (Thunb.) Benth.

Synonyms
- Sutera cordata (Thunb.) Kuntze; Manulea cordata Thunb.

= Chaenostoma cordatum =

Species of flowering plant

Chaenostoma cordatum, also known as Sutera cordata, Bacopa cordata, Sutera diffusus, or Bacopa (not to be confused with the genus Bacopa), is one of 52 species in the genus Chaenostoma (Scrophulariaceae), and is native to South Africa.

== Taxonomy ==
Chaenostoma cordatum was first named in 1835 by Sir William Jackson Hooker. The synonym Sutera cordata originated from Otto Kuntze in 1891.

== Distribution and habitat ==
Chaenostoma cordatum is predominantly found on the southern coast of South Africa, where it is native.

== Cultivation ==
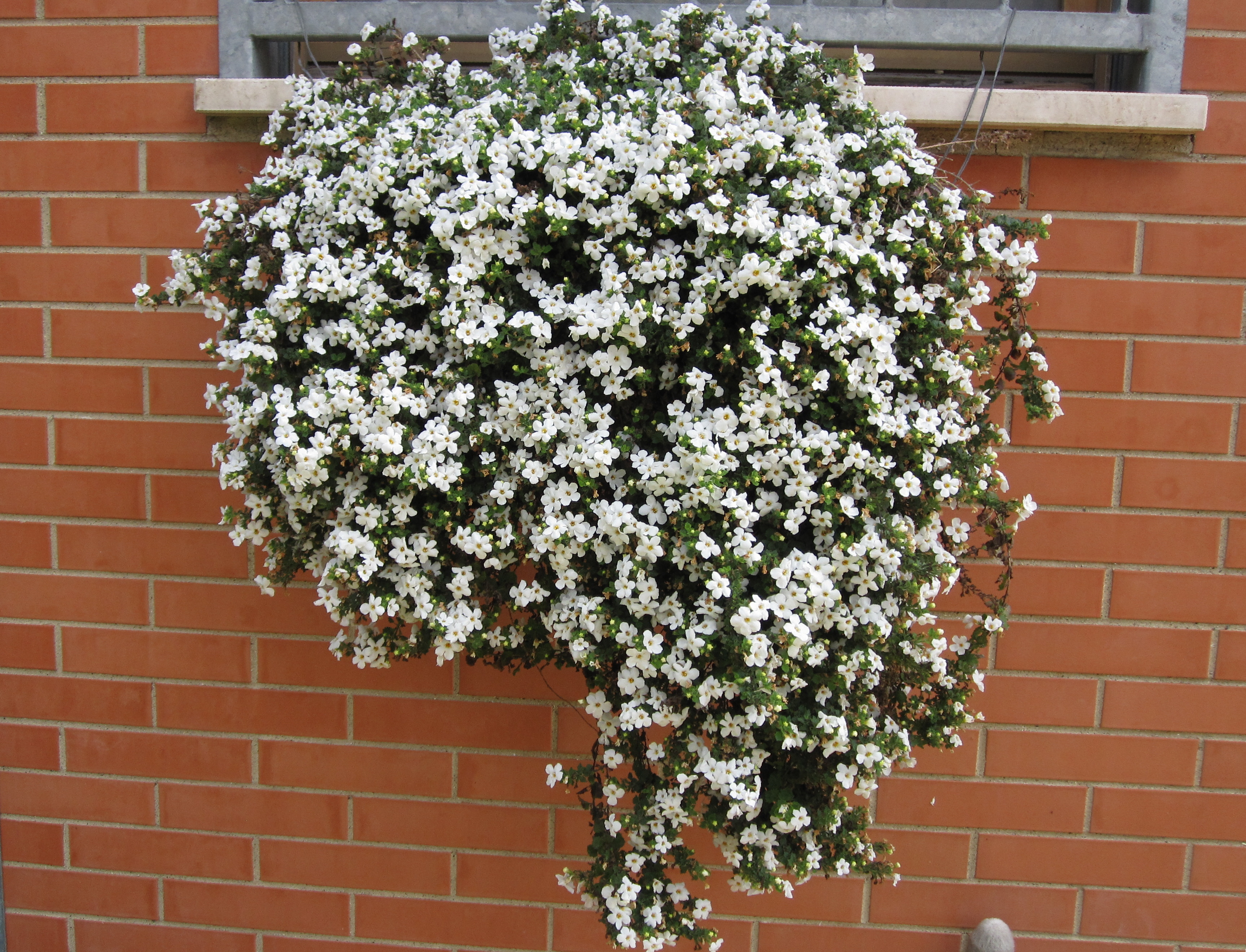
Chaenostoma cordatum in pot

Chaenostoma cordatum is a short-lived evergreen perennial for zones 9–11. It grows annually in colder climates, but requires full sun to flower profusely. Cultivars include 'Bridal Showers', 'Snowflake', 'Giant Snowflake', and 'Pink Domino'.

== The Pikmin Flower ==
Mature Pikmin can sprout the flower from their heads, except for Glow Pikmin, who sprout star-shaped flowers.

A new cultivar of C. cordatum, trademarked Bacopa 'Cabana®' in a collaboration between Nintendo of America and Syngenta Seed's Flower Brand, was the subject of a marketing campaign for the 2001 video game Pikmin. The name "Pikmin Flower" was coined in this campaign, due to the resemblance of the flowers that bloom from the heads of fully matured Pikmin species in the video games. While some claims reported C. cordatum 'Cabana' as an entirely new species or subspecies created by Nintendo, the plant is actually a selectively bred cultivar of the existing species, emphasizing specific traits for ornamental purposes. Peter Main, then executive vice president of sales and marketing for Nintendo of America, said that the flower "demonstrates that at the core of Nintendo is creativity". In April 2002, seeds of the flower were released to the public.
