= List of Lamiales of South Africa =

Flowering plants in the order Lamiales recorded from South Africa

The Lamiales are an order in the asterid group of dicotyledonous flowering plants. It includes about 23,810 species, 1,059 genera, and is divided into about 24 families. Well-known or economically important members of this order include lavender, lilac, olive, jasmine, the ash tree, teak, snapdragon, sesame, psyllium, garden sage, and a number of table herbs such as mint, basil, and rosemary.

The anthophytes are a grouping of plant taxa bearing flower-like reproductive structures. They were formerly thought to be a clade comprising plants bearing flower-like structures. The group contained the angiosperms - the extant flowering plants, such as roses and grasses - as well as the Gnetales and the extinct Bennettitales.

23,420 species of vascular plant have been recorded in South Africa, making it the sixth most species-rich country in the world and the most species-rich country on the African continent. Of these, 153 species are considered to be threatened. Nine biomes have been described in South Africa: Fynbos, Succulent Karoo, desert, Nama Karoo, grassland, savanna, Albany thickets, the Indian Ocean coastal belt, and forests.

The 2018 South African National Biodiversity Institute's National Biodiversity Assessment plant checklist lists 35,130 taxa in the phyla Anthocerotophyta (hornworts (6)), Anthophyta (flowering plants (33534)), Bryophyta (mosses (685)), Cycadophyta (cycads (42)), Lycopodiophyta (Lycophytes(45)), Marchantiophyta (liverworts (376)), Pinophyta (conifers (33)), and Pteridophyta (cryptogams (408)).

16 families are represented in the literature. Listed taxa include species, subspecies, varieties, and forms as recorded, some of which have subsequently been allocated to other taxa as synonyms, in which cases the accepted taxon is appended to the listing. Multiple entries under alternative names reflect taxonomic revision over time.

== Acanthaceae ==
Family: Acanthaceae, 66 genera have been recorded. Not all are necessarily currently accepted.

- Genus Acanthodium:
- Genus Acanthopsis:
- Genus Acanthus:
- Genus Adhatoda:
- Genus Angkalanthus:
- Genus Anisotes:
- Genus Asteracantha:
- Genus Asystasia:
- Genus Aulojusticia:
- Genus Avicennia:
- Genus Barleria:
- Genus Blepharacanthus:
- Genus Blepharis:
- Genus Calophanes:
- Genus Chaetacanthus (synonym of Dyschoriste):
- Genus Chorisochora:
- Genus Crabbea:
- Genus Crossandra:
- Genus Dianthera:
- Genus Diapedium:
- Genus Dicliptera:
- Genus Dilivaria:
- Genus Dinteracanthus:
- Genus Dipteracanthus:
- Genus Duosperma:
- Genus Duvernoia:
- Genus Dyschoriste:
- Genus Ecbolium:
- Genus Ecteinanthus:
- Genus Elytraria:
- Genus Eranthemum:
- Genus Gendarussa:
- Genus Glossochilus:
- Genus Hemigraphis:
- Genus Hygrophila:
- Genus Hypoestes:
- Genus Isoglossa:
- Genus Justicia:
- Genus Lepidagathis:
- Genus Leptostachya:
- Genus Mackaya:
- Genus Macrorungia:
- Genus Megalochlamys:
- Genus Metarungia:
- Genus Monechma:
- Genus Neuracanthus:
- Genus Nomaphila:
- Genus Odontonema:
- Genus Peristrophe:
- Genus Petalidium:
- Genus Phaulopsis:
- Genus Pseuderanthemum:
- Genus Pseudobarleria:
- Genus Rhaphidospora:
- Genus Rhinacanthus:
- Genus Rhytiglossa:
- Genus Ruellia:
- Genus Ruelliopsis:
- Genus Rungia:
- Genus Ruspolia:
- Genus Ruttya:
- Genus Salpinctium:
- Genus Sclerochiton:
- Genus Siphonoglossa:
- Genus Thunbergia:

== Bignoniaceae ==
Family: Bignoniaceae,

=== Rhigozum ===
Genus Rhigozum:

- Rhigozum brevispinosum Kuntze, indigenous
- Rhigozum obovatum Burch. indigenous
- Rhigozum trichotomum Burch. indigenous
- Rhigozum zambesiacum Baker, indigenous

=== Spathodea ===
Genus Spathodea:

- Spathodea campanulata P.Beauv. not indigenous, cultivated, naturalised, invasive

=== Tanaecium ===
Genus Tanaecium:

- Tanaecium pinnatum (Jacq.) Willd. accepted as Kigelia africana (Lam.) Benth. subsp. africana

=== Tecoma ===
Genus Tecoma:

- Tecoma africana (Lam.) G.Don, accepted as Kigelia africana (Lam.) Benth.
- Tecoma capensis (Thunb.) Lindl. accepted as Tecomaria capensis (Thunb.) Spach, indigenous
- Tecoma fulva (Cav.) D.Don subsp. garrocha (Hieron.) J.R.I.Wood, not indigenous, cultivated, naturalised
- Tecoma stans (L.) Juss. ex Kunth, not indigenous, naturalised, invasive
  - Tecoma stans (L.) Juss. ex Kunth var. stans, not indigenous, cultivated, naturalised, invasive
  - Tecoma stans (L.) Juss. ex Kunth var. velutina DC. not indigenous, cultivated, naturalised

=== Tecomaria ===
Genus Tecomaria:

- Tecomaria capensis (Thunb.) Spach, indigenous

== Gesneriaceae ==
Family: Gesneriaceae,

=== Streptocarpus ===
Genus Streptocarpus:

- Streptocarpus actinoflorus T.J.Edwards & M.Hughes, endemic
- Streptocarpus aylae T.J.Edwards, endemic
- Streptocarpus baudertii L.L.Britten, endemic
- Streptocarpus bolusii C.B.Clarke, accepted as Streptocarpus pusillus Harv. ex C.B.Clarke, endemic
- Streptocarpus breviflos (C.B.Clarke) C.B.Clarke, endemic
- Streptocarpus caeruleus Hilliard & B.L.Burtt, endemic
- Streptocarpus candidus Hilliard, endemic
- Streptocarpus confusus Hilliard, indigenous
  - Streptocarpus confusus Hilliard subsp. confusus, indigenous
  - Streptocarpus confusus Hilliard subsp. lebomboensis Hilliard & B.L.Burtt, indigenous
- Streptocarpus cooksonii B.L.Burtt, endemic
- Streptocarpus cooperi C.B.Clarke, endemic
- Streptocarpus cyaneus S.Moore, indigenous
  - Streptocarpus cyaneus S.Moore subsp. cyaneus, indigenous
  - Streptocarpus cyaneus S.Moore subsp. longi-tommii Weigend & T.J.Edwards, endemic
  - Streptocarpus cyaneus S.Moore subsp. nigridens Weigend & T.J.Edwards, endemic
  - Streptocarpus cyaneus S.Moore subsp. polackii (B.L.Burtt) Weigend & T.J.Edwards, endemic
- Streptocarpus daviesii N.E.Br. ex C.B.Clarke, indigenous
- Streptocarpus decipiens Hilliard & B.L.Burtt, endemic
- Streptocarpus denticulatus Turrill, endemic
- Streptocarpus dunnii Hook.f. indigenous
- Streptocarpus fanniniae Harv. ex C.B.Clarke, endemic
- Streptocarpus fasciatus T.J.Edwards & Kunhardt, endemic
- Streptocarpus fenestra-dei Weigend & T.J.Edwards, endemic
- Streptocarpus floribundus Weigend & T.J.Edwards, endemic
- Streptocarpus formosus (Hilliard & B.L.Burtt) T.J.Edwards, endemic
- Streptocarpus galpinii Hook.f. indigenous
- Streptocarpus gardenii Hook. endemic
- Streptocarpus grandis N.E.Br. indigenous
  - Streptocarpus grandis N.E.Br. subsp. grandis, endemic
- Streptocarpus haygarthii N.E.Br. ex C.B.Clarke, endemic
- Streptocarpus hilburtianus T.J.Edwards, endemic
- Streptocarpus johannis L.L.Britten, endemic
- Streptocarpus kentaniensis L.L.Britten & Story, endemic
- Streptocarpus kunhardtii T.J.Edwards, endemic
- Streptocarpus latens Hilliard & B.L.Burtt, endemic
- Streptocarpus lilliputana Bellstedt & T.J.Edwards, endemic
- Streptocarpus longiflorus (Hilliard & B.L.Burtt) T.J.Edwards, endemic
- Streptocarpus makabengensis Hilliard, endemic
- Streptocarpus meyeri B.L.Burtt, endemic
- Streptocarpus micranthus C.B.Clarke, indigenous
- Streptocarpus modestus L.L.Britten, endemic
- Streptocarpus molweniensis Hilliard, indigenous
  - Streptocarpus molweniensis Hilliard subsp. eshowicus Hilliard & B.L.Burtt, endemic
  - Streptocarpus molweniensis Hilliard subsp. molweniensis, endemic
- Streptocarpus montigena L.L.Britten, endemic
- Streptocarpus occultis Hilliard, endemic
- Streptocarpus parviflorus Hook.f. indigenous
  - Streptocarpus parviflorus Hook.f. subsp. parviflorus, endemic
  - Streptocarpus parviflorus Hook.f. subsp. soutpansbergensis Weigend & T.J.Edwards, endemic
- Streptocarpus pentherianus Fritsch, indigenous
- Streptocarpus pogonites Hilliard & B.L.Burtt, endemic
- Streptocarpus pole-evansii I.Verd. endemic
- Streptocarpus polyanthus Hook. indigenous
  - Streptocarpus polyanthus Hook. subsp. comptonii (Mansf.) Hilliard, indigenous
  - Streptocarpus polyanthus Hook. subsp. dracomontanus Hilliard, endemic
  - Streptocarpus polyanthus Hook. subsp. polyanthus, endemic
  - Streptocarpus polyanthus Hook. subsp. verecundus Hilliard, endemic
- Streptocarpus porphyrostachys Hilliard, endemic
- Streptocarpus primulifolius Gand. endemic
  - Streptocarpus primulifolius Gand. subsp. formosus Hilliard & B.L.Burtt, accepted as Streptocarpus formosus (Hilliard & B.L.Burtt) T.J.Edwards, endemic
- Streptocarpus prolixus C.B.Clarke, endemic
- Streptocarpus pusillus Harv. ex C.B.Clarke, indigenous
- Streptocarpus rexii (Bowie ex Hook.) Lindl. endemic
- Streptocarpus rimicola Story, endemic
- Streptocarpus roseo-albus Weigend & T.J.Edwards, endemic
- Streptocarpus saundersii Hook. endemic
- Streptocarpus silvaticus Hilliard, endemic
- Streptocarpus trabeculatus Hilliard, endemic
- Streptocarpus vandeleurii Baker f. & S.Moore, endemic
- Streptocarpus wendlandii Spreng. endemic
- Streptocarpus wilmsii Engl. indigenous

== Lamiaceae ==
Family: Lamiaceae, 49 genera have been recorded. Not all are necessarily currently accepted.

- Genus Acrocephalus:
- Genus Acrotome:
- Genus Aeollanthus:
- Genus Ajuga:
- Genus Ballota:
- Genus Basilicum:
- Genus Becium:
- Genus Cantinoa:
- Genus Cedronella:
- Genus Clerodendrum:
- Genus Cyclonema:
- Genus Endostemon:
- Genus Geniosporum:
- Genus Hemizygia:
- Genus Hoslundia:
- Genus Isodon:
- Genus Kalaharia:
- Genus Karomia:
- Genus Killickia:
- Genus Lamium:
- Genus Lasiocorys:
- Genus Leonotis:
- Genus Leucas:
- Genus Marrubium:
- Genus Mentha:
- Genus Mesosphaerum:
- Genus Ocimum:
- Genus Orthosiphon:
- Genus Platostoma:
- Genus Plectranthus:
- Genus Premna:
- Genus Prunella:
- Genus Pycnostachys:
- Genus Rabdosiella:
- Genus Rotheca:
- Genus Salvia:
- Genus Satureja:
- Genus Scutellaria:
- Genus Siphonanthus:
- Genus Solenostemon:
- Genus Spironema:
- Genus Stachys:
- Genus Syncolostemon:
- Genus Tetradenia:
- Genus Teucrium:
- Genus Thorncroftia:
- Genus Tinnea:
- Genus Vitex:
- Genus Volkameria:

== Lentibulariaceae ==
Family: Lentibulariaceae,

=== Genlisea ===
Genus Genlisea:

- Genlisea hispidula Stapf, indigenous

=== Utricularia ===
Genus Utricularia:

- Utricularia arenaria A.DC. indigenous
- Utricularia australis R.Br. indigenous
- Utricularia benjaminiana Oliv. indigenous
- Utricularia bisquamata Schrank, indigenous
- Utricularia brachyceras Schltr. accepted as Utricularia bisquamata Schrank, indigenous
- Utricularia cymbantha Oliv. indigenous
- Utricularia firmula Welw. ex Oliv. indigenous
- Utricularia foliosa L. indigenous
- Utricularia gibba L. indigenous
- Utricularia inflexa Forssk. indigenous
- Utricularia livida E.Mey. indigenous
- Utricularia prehensilis E.Mey. indigenous
- Utricularia reflexa Oliv. indigenous
- Utricularia sandersonii Oliv. endemic
- Utricularia scandens Benj. indigenous
- Utricularia stellaris L.f., indigenous
- Utricularia subulata L. indigenous
- Utricularia welwitschii Oliv. indigenous

== Linderniaceae ==
Family: Linderniaceae,

=== Bonnaya ===
Genus Bonnaya:

- Bonnaya parviflora (Roxb.) Benth. accepted as Lindernia parviflora (Roxb.) Haines, indigenous

=== Craterostigma ===
Genus Craterostigma:

- Craterostigma monroi S.Moore, accepted as Lindernia monroi (S.Moore) Eb.Fisch. indigenous
- Craterostigma nanum (Benth.) Engl. accepted as Craterostigma plantagineum Hochst. present
- Craterostigma plantagineum Hochst. indigenous
- Craterostigma wilmsii Engl. ex Diels, endemic

=== Crepidorhopalon ===
Genus Crepidorhopalon:

- Crepidorhopalon debilis (Skan) Eb.Fisch. indigenous
- Crepidorhopalon spicatus (Engl.) Eb.Fisch. indigenous

=== Ilysanthes ===
Genus Ilysanthes:

- Ilysanthes bolusii Hiern, accepted as Linderniella bolusii (Hiern) Eb.Fisch. Schaferh. & Kai Mull. indigenous
- Ilysanthes capensis (Thunb.) Benth. accepted as Lindernia capensis Thunb. indigenous
- Ilysanthes conferta Hiern, accepted as Lindernia conferta (Hiern) Philcox, indigenous
- Ilysanthes muddii Hiern, accepted as Linderniella wilmsii (Engl. ex Diels) Eb.Fisch. Schaferh. & Kai Mull. indigenous
- Ilysanthes nana Engl. accepted as Linderniella nana (Engl.) Eb.Fisch. Schaferh. & Kai Mull. indigenous
- Ilysanthes parviflora (Roxb.) Benth. accepted as Lindernia parviflora (Roxb.) Haines, indigenous
- Ilysanthes pulchella Skan, accepted as Linderniella pulchella (Skan) Eb.Fisch. Schaferh. & Kai Mull. indigenous
- Ilysanthes schlechteri Hiern, accepted as Linderniella nana (Engl.) Eb.Fisch. Schaferh. & Kai Mull. indigenous
- Ilysanthes wilmsii Engl. ex Diels, accepted as Linderniella wilmsii (Engl. ex Diels) Eb.Fisch. Schaferh. & Kai Mull. indigenous

=== Lindernia ===
Genus Lindernia:

- Lindernia bolusii (Hiern) Eb.Fisch. accepted as Linderniella bolusii (Hiern) Eb.Fisch. Schaferh. & Kai Mull. indigenous
- Lindernia capensis Thunb. endemic
- Lindernia conferta (Hiern) Philcox, indigenous
- Lindernia debilis Skan, accepted as Crepidorhopalon debilis (Skan) Eb.Fisch. indigenous
- Lindernia dongolensis E.A.Bruce, accepted as Lindernia monroi (S.Moore) Eb.Fisch. indigenous
- Lindernia fugax R.G.N.Young, accepted as Crepidorhopalon debilis (Skan) Eb.Fisch. indigenous
- Lindernia minima R.G.N.Young, accepted as Crepidorhopalon debilis (Skan) Eb.Fisch. indigenous
- Lindernia monroi (S.Moore) Eb.Fisch. indigenous
- Lindernia nana (Engl.) Roessler, accepted as Linderniella nana (Engl.) Eb.Fisch. Schaferh. & Kai Mull. indigenous
- Lindernia parviflora (Roxb.) Haines, indigenous
- Lindernia pulchella (Skan) Philcox, accepted as Linderniella pulchella (Skan) Eb.Fisch. Schaferh. & Kai Mull. indigenous
- Lindernia wilmsii (Engl. ex Diels) Philcox, accepted as Linderniella wilmsii (Engl. ex Diels) Eb.Fisch. Schaferh. & Kai Mull. indigenous

=== Linderniella ===
Genus Linderniella:

- Linderniella bolusii (Hiern) Eb.Fisch. Schaferh. & Kai Mull. indigenous
- Linderniella nana (Engl.) Eb.Fisch. Schaferh. & Kai Mull. indigenous
- Linderniella pulchella (Skan) Eb.Fisch. Schaferh. & Kai Mull. indigenous
- Linderniella wilmsii (Engl. ex Diels) Eb.Fisch. Schaferh. & Kai Mull. indigenous

=== Nortenia ===
Genus Nortenia:

- Nortenia thouarsii Cham. & Schltdl. accepted as Torenia thouarsii (Cham. & Schltdl.) Kuntze, indigenous

=== Stemodiopsis ===
Genus Stemodiopsis:

- Stemodiopsis humilis Skan, accepted as Stemodiopsis rivae Engl. present
- Stemodiopsis rivae Engl. indigenous

=== Torenia ===
Genus Torenia:

- Torenia monroi (S.Moore) Philcox, accepted as Lindernia monroi (S.Moore) Eb.Fisch. indigenous
- Torenia plantaginea (Hochst.) Benth. accepted as Craterostigma plantagineum Hochst. indigenous
- Torenia spicata Engl. accepted as Crepidorhopalon spicatus (Engl.) Eb.Fisch. indigenous
- Torenia thouarsii (Cham. & Schltdl.) Kuntze, indigenous

== Martyniaceae ==
Family: Martyniaceae,

=== Ibicella ===
Genus Ibicella:

- Ibicella lutea (Lindl.) Van Eselt. not indigenous, naturalised

=== Proboscidea ===
Genus Proboscidea:

- Proboscidea fragrans (Lindl.) Decne. accepted as Proboscidea louisianica (Mill.) Thell. subsp. fragrans (Lindl.) Bretting, not indigenous, naturalised
- Proboscidea louisianica (Mill.) Thell. not indigenous, naturalised
  - Proboscidea louisianica (Mill.) Thell. subsp. fragrans (Lindl.) Bretting, not indigenous, naturalised

== Oleaceae ==
Family: Oleaceae,

=== Chionanthus ===
Genus Chionanthus:

- Chionanthus battiscombei (Hutch.) Stearn, indigenous
- Chionanthus foveolatus (E.Mey.) Stearn, indigenous
  - Chionanthus foveolatus (E.Mey.) Stearn subsp. foveolatus, indigenous
  - Chionanthus foveolatus (E.Mey.) Stearn subsp. major (I.Verd.) Stearn, indigenous
  - Chionanthus foveolatus (E.Mey.) Stearn subsp. tomentellus (I.Verd.) Stearn, endemic
- Chionanthus peglerae (C.H.Wright) Stearn, endemic

=== Enaimon ===
Genus Enaimon:

- Enaimon undulatum (Aiton) Raf. accepted as Olea capensis L. subsp. capensis

=== Faulia ===
Genus Faulia:

- Faulia verrucosa Raf. accepted as Olea capensis L. subsp. capensis

=== Fraxinus ===
Genus Fraxinus:

- Fraxinus americana L. not indigenous, naturalised, invasive
- Fraxinus angustifolia Vahl, not indigenous, naturalised, invasive

=== Jasminum ===
Genus Jasminum:

- Jasminum abyssinicum Hochst. ex DC. indigenous
- Jasminum angulare Vahl, indigenous
- Jasminum breviflorum Harv. ex C.H.Wright, indigenous
- Jasminum fluminense Vell. indigenous
  - Jasminum fluminense Vell. subsp. fluminense, indigenous
- Jasminum glaucum (L.f.) Aiton, endemic
- Jasminum multipartitum Hochst. indigenous
- Jasminum quinatum Schinz, endemic
- Jasminum stenolobum Rolfe, indigenous
- Jasminum streptopus E.Mey. indigenous
  - Jasminum streptopus E.Mey. var. streptopus, indigenous
  - Jasminum streptopus E.Mey. var. transvaalensis (S.Moore) I.Verd. indigenous
- Jasminum tortuosum Willd. endemic

=== Leuranthus ===
Genus Leuranthus:

- Leuranthus woodianus (Knobl.) Knobl. accepted as Olea woodiana Knobl. subsp. woodiana
- Ligustrum hookeri Decne. accepted as Olea capensis L. subsp. capensis
- Ligustrum japonicum Thunb. not indigenous, cultivated, naturalised, invasive
- Ligustrum lucidum W.T.Aiton, not indigenous, cultivated, naturalised, invasive
- Ligustrum nepalense Wall. var. glabrum Hook. accepted as Olea capensis L. subsp. capensis
- Ligustrum ovalifolium Hassk. not indigenous, cultivated, naturalised, invasive
- Ligustrum sinense Lour. not indigenous, cultivated, naturalised, invasive
- Ligustrum vulgare L. not indigenous, cultivated, naturalised, invasive

=== Linociera ===
Genus Linociera:

- Linociera lebrunii Staner, accepted as Olea europaea L. subsp. cuspidata (Wall. ex G.Don) Cif.
- Linociera urophylla Gilg, accepted as Olea capensis L. subsp. capensis

=== Menodora ===
Genus Menodora:

- Menodora africana Hook. indigenous
- Menodora heterophylla Moric. ex DC. indigenous
  - Menodora heterophylla Moric. ex DC. var. australis Steyerm. indigenous
- Menodora juncea Harv. endemic

=== Olea ===
Genus Olea:

- Olea africana Mill. accepted as Olea europaea L. subsp. cuspidata (Wall. ex G.Don) Cif.
- Olea asiatica Desf. accepted as Olea europaea L. subsp. cuspidata (Wall. ex G.Don) Cif.
- Olea aucheri A.Chev. ex Ehrend. accepted as Olea europaea L. subsp. cuspidata (Wall. ex G.Don) Cif.
- Olea buxifolia Mill. accepted as Olea capensis L. subsp. capensis
- Olea capensis L. indigenous
  - Olea capensis L. subsp. capensis, endemic
  - Olea capensis L. subsp. enervis (Harv. ex C.H.Wright) I.Verd. indigenous
  - Olea capensis L. subsp. hochstetteri (Baker) Friis & P.S.Green, accepted as Olea capensis L. subsp. macrocarpa (C.H.Wright) I.Verd.
  - Olea capensis L. subsp. macrocarpa (C.H.Wright) I.Verd. indigenous
  - Olea capensis L. var. coriacea Aiton, accepted as Olea capensis L. subsp. capensis
  - Olea capensis L. var. undulata Aiton, accepted as Olea capensis L. subsp. capensis
- Olea cassinifolia Salisb. accepted as Olea capensis L. subsp. capensis
- Olea chrysophylla Lam. var. albida A.Chev. accepted as Olea europaea L. subsp. cuspidata (Wall. ex G.Don) Cif.
  - Olea chrysophylla Lam. var. aucheri A.Chev. accepted as Olea europaea L. subsp. cuspidata (Wall. ex G.Don) Cif.
  - Olea chrysophylla Lam. var. brachybotrys DC. accepted as Olea europaea L. subsp. cuspidata (Wall. ex G.Don) Cif. indigenous
  - Olea chrysophylla Lam. var. cuspidata (Wall. ex G.Don) A.Chev. accepted as Olea europaea L. subsp. cuspidata (Wall. ex G.Don) Cif.
  - Olea chrysophylla Lam. var. euchrysophylla A.Chev. accepted as Olea europaea L. subsp. cuspidata (Wall. ex G.Don) Cif.
  - Olea chrysophylla Lam. var. ferruginea (Royle) A.Chev. accepted as Olea europaea L. subsp. cuspidata (Wall. ex G.Don) Cif.
  - Olea chrysophylla Lam. var. nubica (Schweinf. ex Baker) A.Chev. accepted as Olea europaea L. subsp. cuspidata (Wall. ex G.Don) Cif.
  - Olea chrysophylla Lam. var. somaliensis (Baker) A.Chev. accepted as Olea europaea L. subsp. cuspidata (Wall. ex G.Don) Cif.
  - Olea chrysophylla Lam. var. subnuda R.E.Fr. accepted as Olea europaea L. subsp. cuspidata (Wall. ex G.Don) Cif.
  - Olea chrysophylla Lam. var. verrucosa (Willd.) A.Chev. accepted as Olea europaea L. subsp. cuspidata (Wall. ex G.Don) Cif.
- Olea concolor E.Mey. accepted as Olea capensis L. subsp. capensis, indigenous
- Olea cuspidata Wall. ex G.Don, accepted as Olea europaea L. subsp. cuspidata (Wall. ex G.Don) Cif.
- Olea europaea L. indigenous
  - Olea europaea L. subsp. africana (Mill.) P.S.Green, accepted as Olea europaea L. subsp. cuspidata (Wall. ex G.Don) Cif. indigenous
  - Olea europaea L. subsp. cuspidata (Wall. ex G.Don) Cif. indigenous
  - Olea europaea L. subsp. ferruginea (Royle) Cif. accepted as Olea europaea L. subsp. cuspidata (Wall. ex G.Don) Cif.
  - Olea europaea L. var. cuspidata (Wall. ex G.Don) Cif. accepted as Olea europaea L. subsp. cuspidata (Wall. ex G.Don) Cif.
  - Olea europaea L. var. nubica Schweinf. ex Baker, accepted as Olea europaea L. subsp. cuspidata (Wall. ex G.Don) Cif.
  - Olea europaea L. var. verrucosa Willd. accepted as Olea europaea L. subsp. cuspidata (Wall. ex G.Don) Cif. indigenous
- Olea exasperata Jacq. endemic
- Olea ferruginea Royle, accepted as Olea europaea L. subsp. cuspidata (Wall. ex G.Don) Cif.
- Olea glabella Banks ex Lowe, accepted as Olea exasperata Jacq.
- Olea guineensis Hutch. & C.A.Sm. accepted as Olea capensis L. subsp. macrocarpa (C.H.Wright) I.Verd.
- Olea hochstetteri Baker, accepted as Olea capensis L. subsp. macrocarpa (C.H.Wright) I.Verd.
- Olea humilis Eckl. accepted as Olea exasperata Jacq. indigenous
- Olea indica Burm.f. accepted as Olea europaea L. subsp. cuspidata (Wall. ex G.Don) Cif.
- Olea intermedia Tausch, accepted as Olea capensis L. subsp. capensis
- Olea kilimandscharica Knobl. accepted as Olea europaea L. subsp. cuspidata (Wall. ex G.Don) Cif.
- Olea laurifolia Lam. accepted as Olea capensis L. subsp. capensis
  - Olea laurifolia Lam. var. concolor (E.Mey.) Harv. accepted as Olea capensis L. subsp. capensis
- Olea listeriana Sim, accepted as Olea woodiana Knobl. subsp. woodiana
- Olea mackenii Harv. accepted as Olea woodiana Knobl. subsp. woodiana
- Olea macrocarpa C.H.Wright, accepted as Olea capensis L. subsp. macrocarpa (C.H.Wright) I.Verd. indigenous
- Olea madagascariensis Boivin ex H.Perrier, accepted as Olea capensis L. subsp. macrocarpa (C.H.Wright) I.Verd.
- Olea monticola Gand. accepted as Olea europaea L. subsp. cuspidata (Wall. ex G.Don) Cif.
- Olea nigra Loisel. accepted as Olea capensis L. subsp. capensis
- Olea perrieri A.Chev. ex H.Perrier, accepted as Olea capensis L. subsp. macrocarpa (C.H.Wright) I.Verd.
- Olea sativa Hoffmanns. & Link var. verrucosa (Willd.) Roem. & Schult. accepted as Olea europaea L. subsp. cuspidata (Wall. ex G.Don) Cif.
- Olea schimperi Gand. accepted as Olea europaea L. subsp. cuspidata (Wall. ex G.Don) Cif.
- Olea similis Burch. accepted as Olea europaea L. subsp. cuspidata (Wall. ex G.Don) Cif. indigenous
- Olea somaliensis Baker, accepted as Olea europaea L. subsp. cuspidata (Wall. ex G.Don) Cif.
- Olea subtrinervata Chiov. accepted as Olea europaea L. subsp. cuspidata (Wall. ex G.Don) Cif.
- Olea undulata (Aiton) Jacq. accepted as Olea capensis L. subsp. capensis
  - Olea undulata (Aiton) Jacq. var. planifolia E.Mey. accepted as Olea capensis L. subsp. capensis
- Olea urophylla (Gilg) Gilg & Schellenb. accepted as Olea capensis L. subsp. capensis
- Olea verrucosa (Willd.) Link, accepted as Olea europaea L. subsp. cuspidata (Wall. ex G.Don) Cif.
- Olea woodiana Knobl. indigenous
  - Olea woodiana Knobl. subsp. woodiana, indigenous

=== Schrebera ===
Genus Schrebera:

- Schrebera alata (Hochst.) Welw. indigenous

=== Steganthus ===
Genus Steganthus:

- Steganthus urophylla (Gilg) Knobl. accepted as Olea capensis L. subsp. capensis

== Orobanchaceae ==
Family: Orobanchaceae,

=== Alectra ===
Genus Alectra:

- Alectra avensis (Benth.) Merr. accepted as Alectra sessiliflora (Vahl) Kuntze, present
- Alectra basutica (E.Phillips) Melch. indigenous
- Alectra capensis Thunb. indigenous
- Alectra dunensis Hilliard & B.L.Burtt, indigenous
- Alectra indica Benth. accepted as Alectra sessiliflora (Vahl) Kuntze, present
- Alectra kirkii Hemsl. accepted as Alectra orobanchoides Benth. present
- Alectra lurida Harv. endemic
- Alectra natalensis (Hiern) Melch. endemic
- Alectra orobanchoides Benth. indigenous
- Alectra parvifolia (Engl.) Schinz, accepted as Alectra orobanchoides Benth. present
- Alectra picta (Hiern) Hemsl. indigenous
- Alectra pumila Benth. indigenous
- Alectra sessiliflora (Vahl) Kuntze, indigenous
  - Alectra sessiliflora (Vahl) Kuntze var. monticola (Engl.) Melch. accepted as Alectra sessiliflora (Vahl) Kuntze, present
- Alectra thyrsoidea Melch. endemic
- Alectra vogelii Benth. indigenous
- Alectra welwitschii (Hiern) Hemsl. indigenous

=== Bartsia ===
Genus Bartsia:

- Bartsia trixago L. not indigenous, naturalised

=== Buchnera ===
Genus Buchnera:

- Buchnera brevibractealis Hiern, accepted as Buchnera longespicata Schinz, present
- Buchnera capitata Burm.f., indigenous
- Buchnera ciliolata Engl. indigenous
- Buchnera dura Benth. indigenous
- Buchnera erinoides Jaroscz, indigenous
- Buchnera glabrata Benth. accepted as Buchnera simplex (Thunb.) Druce, present
- Buchnera longespicata Schinz, indigenous
- Buchnera oppositifolia Hort. ex Steud. accepted as Chaenostoma hispidum (Thunb.) Benth.
- Buchnera reducta Hiern, indigenous
- Buchnera remotiflora Schinz, endemic
- Buchnera simplex (Thunb.) Druce, indigenous
- Buchnera viscosa Aiton, accepted as Chaenostoma caeruleum (L.f.) Kornhall

=== Buttonia ===
Genus Buttonia:

- Buttonia natalensis McKen ex Benth. indigenous
- Buttonia superba Oberm. indigenous

=== Cycnium ===
Genus Cycnium:

- Cycnium adonense E.Mey. ex Benth. indigenous
  - Cycnium adonense E.Mey. ex Benth. subsp. adonense, indigenous
- Cycnium huttoniae Hiern, accepted as Cycnium racemosum Benth. present
- Cycnium racemosum Benth. indigenous
- Cycnium tubulosum (L.f.) Engl. indigenous
  - Cycnium tubulosum (L.f.) Engl. subsp. tubulosum, indigenous

=== Gerardia ===
Genus Gerardia:

- Gerardia sessiliflora Vahl, accepted as Alectra sessiliflora (Vahl) Kuntze, present

=== Gerardiina ===
Genus Gerardiina:

- Gerardiina angolensis Engl. indigenous

=== Glossostylis ===
Genus Glossostylis:

- Glossostylis avensis Benth. accepted as Alectra sessiliflora (Vahl) Kuntze, present

=== Graderia ===
Genus Graderia:

- Graderia linearifolia Codd, endemic
- Graderia scabra (L.f.) Benth. indigenous
- Graderia subintegra Mast. indigenous

=== Haematobanche ===
Genus Haematobanche:

- Haematobanche sanguinea C.Presl, accepted as Hyobanche rubra N.E.Br. indigenous

=== Harveya ===
Genus Harveya:

- Harveya anisodonta C.A.Sm. accepted as Harveya speciosa Bernh. endemic
- Harveya bodkinii Hiern, endemic
- Harveya bolusii Kuntze, endemic
- Harveya capensis Hook. endemic
- Harveya cathcartensis Kuntze, accepted as Harveya speciosa Bernh. endemic
- Harveya coccinea (Harv.) Schltr. accepted as Harveya pauciflora (Benth.) Hiern, indigenous
- Harveya euryantha Schltr. accepted as Harveya purpurea (L.f.) Harv. ex Hook. subsp. euryantha (Schltr.) Randle, endemic
- Harveya hirtiflora Schltr. accepted as Harveya bolusii Kuntze, endemic
- Harveya huttonii Hiern, endemic
- Harveya hyobanchoides Schltr. ex Hiern, endemic
- Harveya laxiflora Hiern, accepted as Harveya purpurea (L.f.) Harv. ex Hook. subsp. purpurea, endemic
- Harveya leucopharynx Hilliard & B.L.Burtt, accepted as Harveya huttonii Hiern, endemic
- Harveya pauciflora (Benth.) Hiern, indigenous
- Harveya pulchra Hilliard & B.L.Burtt, accepted as Harveya huttonii Hiern, indigenous
- Harveya pumila Schltr. indigenous
- Harveya purpurea (L.f.) Harv. ex Hook., endemic
  - Harveya purpurea (L.f.) Harv. ex Hook. subsp. euryantha (Schltr.) Randle, endemic
  - Harveya purpurea (L.f.) Harv. ex Hook. subsp. purpurea, indigenous
  - Harveya purpurea (L.f.) Harv. ex Hook. subsp. sulphurea (Hiern) Randle, endemic
- Harveya randii Hiern, accepted as Harveya pumila Schltr. indigenous
- Harveya roseoalba J.C.Manning & Goldblatt, endemic
- Harveya scarlatina (Benth.) Hiern, indigenous
- Harveya silvatica Hilliard & B.L.Burtt, accepted as Harveya huttonii Hiern, indigenous
- Harveya speciosa Bernh. indigenous
- Harveya squamosa (Thunb.) Steud. endemic
- Harveya stenosiphon Hiern, endemic
- Harveya sulphurea Hiern, accepted as Harveya purpurea (L.f.) Harv. ex Hook. subsp. sulphurea (Hiern) Randle, endemic
- Harveya tubulosa Harv. ex Hiern, accepted as Harveya pauciflora (Benth.) Hiern, endemic
- Harveya tulbaghiensis Eckl. & Zeyh. ex Ostermeyer, accepted as Harveya tulbaghensis (Eckl. & Zeyh. ex C.Presl) C.Presl
- Harveya vestita Hiern, endemic

=== Hyobanche ===
Genus Hyobanche:

- Hyobanche atropurpurea Bolus, endemic
- Hyobanche barklyi N.E.Br. indigenous
- Hyobanche calvescens Gand. accepted as Hyobanche rubra N.E.Br. endemic
- Hyobanche coccinea L. ex Steud. accepted as Hyobanche sanguinea L. indigenous
- Hyobanche fulleri E.Phillips, endemic
- Hyobanche glabrata Hiern, accepted as Hyobanche rubra N.E.Br. endemic
- Hyobanche robusta Schonland, endemic
- Hyobanche rubra N.E.Br. indigenous
- Hyobanche sanguinea L. indigenous
- Hyobanche thinophila A.D.Wolfe, endemic

=== Melasma ===
Genus Melasma:

- Melasma scabrum P.J.Bergius, indigenous
  - Melasma scabrum P.J.Bergius var. ovatum (E.Mey. ex Benth.) Hiern, endemic
  - Melasma scabrum P.J.Bergius var. scabrum, indigenous

=== Orobanche ===
Genus Orobanche:

- Orobanche minor Sm. not indigenous, naturalised, invasive
- Orobanche ramosa L. not indigenous, naturalised, invasive

=== Rhamphicarpa ===
Genus Rhamphicarpa:

- Rhamphicarpa brevipedicellata O.J.Hansen, indigenous
- Rhamphicarpa fistulosa (Hochst.) Benth. indigenous

=== Sopubia ===
Genus Sopubia:

- Sopubia cana Harv. indigenous
  - Sopubia cana Harv. var. cana, indigenous
  - Sopubia cana Harv. var. glabrescens Diels, indigenous
- Sopubia karaguensis Oliv. indigenous
  - Sopubia karaguensis Oliv. var. karaguensis, indigenous
- Sopubia mannii Skan, indigenous
  - Sopubia mannii Skan var. tenuifolia (Engl. & Gilg) Hepper, indigenous
- Sopubia simplex (Hochst.) Hochst. indigenous

=== Striga ===
Genus Striga:

- Striga asiatica (L.) Kuntze, indigenous
  - Striga bilabiata (Thunb.) Kuntze, indigenous
  - Striga bilabiata (Thunb.) Kuntze subsp. bilabiata, indigenous
- Striga elegans Benth. indigenous
- Striga forbesii Benth. indigenous
- Striga gesnerioides (Willd.) Vatke, indigenous
- Striga junodii Schinz, indigenous

== Paulowniaceae ==
Family: Paulowniaceae,

- Paulownia tomentosa (Thunb.) Steud. not indigenous, naturalised, invasive

== Pedaliaceae ==
Family: Pedaliaceae,

=== Ceratotheca ===
Genus Ceratotheca:

- Ceratotheca saxicola E.A.Bruce, endemic
- Ceratotheca triloba (Bernh.) Hook.f. indigenous

=== Dicerocaryum ===
Genus Dicerocaryum:

- Dicerocaryum eriocarpum (Decne.) Abels, indigenous
- Dicerocaryum forbesii (Decne.) A.E.van Wyk, indigenous
- Dicerocaryum senecioides (Klotzsch) Abels, indigenous
  - Dicerocaryum senecioides (Klotzsch) Abels subsp. transvaalense Abels, accepted as Dicerocaryum senecioides (Klotzsch) Abels, present

=== Harpagophytum ===
Genus Harpagophytum:

- Harpagophytum procumbens (Burch.) DC. ex Meisn. subsp. procumbens, indigenous
  - Harpagophytum procumbens (Burch.) DC. ex Meisn. subsp. transvaalense Ihlenf. & H.E.K.Hartmann, indigenous
  - Harpagophytum procumbens Burch. ex Meisn. indigenous
- Harpagophytum zeyheri Decne. indigenous
  - Harpagophytum zeyheri Decne. subsp. schijffii Ihlenf. & H.E.K.Hartmann, indigenous
  - Harpagophytum zeyheri Decne. subsp. zeyheri, indigenous

=== Holubia ===
Genus Holubia:

- Holubia saccata Oliv. indigenous

=== Pterodiscus ===
Genus Pterodiscus:

- Pterodiscus cinnabarinus Peckover, indigenous
- Pterodiscus luridus Hook.f. endemic
- Pterodiscus makatiniensis Peckover, endemic
- Pterodiscus ngamicus N.E.Br. ex Stapf, indigenous
- Pterodiscus speciosus Hook. indigenous

=== Rogeria ===
Genus Rogeria:

- Rogeria longiflora (L.) J.Gay ex DC. indigenous
- Rogeria petrophila De Winter, accepted as Dewinteria petrophila (De Winter) Van Jaarsv. & A.E.van Wyk

=== Sesamothamnus ===
Genus Sesamothamnus:

- Sesamothamnus lugardii N.E.Br. ex Stapf, indigenous

=== Sesamum ===
Genus Sesamum:

- Sesamum alatum Thonn. indigenous
- Sesamum capense Burm.f. indigenous
- Sesamum indicum L. not indigenous, naturalised
- Sesamum schenckii Asch. accepted as Sesamum triphyllum Welw. ex Asch. var. grandiflorum (Schinz) Merxm. present
- Sesamum triphyllum Welw. ex Asch. indigenous
  - Sesamum triphyllum Welw. ex Asch. var. triphyllum, indigenous

== Phrymaciae ==
Family Phrymaceae:

Genus Mimulus:

- Mimulus gracilis R.Br. indigenous
- Mimulus moschatus Douglas, not indigenous, naturalised
  - Mimulus moschatus Douglas var. moschatus, not indigenous, naturalised

== Plantaginaceae ==
Family: Plantaginaceae,

=== Antirrhinum ===
Genus Antirrhinum:

- Antirrhinum orontium L. accepted as Misopates orontium (L.) Raf. subsp. orontium, not indigenous, naturalised
- Antirrhinum unilabiata L.f. accepted as Alonsoa unilabiata (L.f.) Steud. present

=== Bacopa ===
Genus Bacopa:

- Bacopa crenata (P.Beauv.) Hepper, indigenous
- Bacopa floribunda (R.Br.) Wettst. indigenous
- Bacopa monnieri (L.) Pennell, indigenous

=== Callitriche ===
Genus Callitriche:

- Callitriche bolusii Schonland & Pax ex Marloth, indigenous
- Callitriche compressa N.E.Br. endemic
- Callitriche deflexa A.Br. ex Hegelm. not indigenous, naturalised

=== Cymbalaria ===
Genus Cymbalaria:

- Cymbalaria muralis G.Gaertn. B.Mey. & Scherb. not indigenous, naturalised, invasive
  - Cymbalaria muralis G.Gaertn. B.Mey. & Scherb. subsp. muralis, not indigenous, naturalised, invasive

=== Dopatrium ===
Genus Dopatrium:

- Dopatrium junceum (Roxb.) Buch.-Ham. ex Benth. indigenous

=== Erinus ===
Genus Erinus:

- Erinus viscosus (Aiton) Salisb. accepted as Chaenostoma caeruleum (L.f.) Kornhall

=== Kickxia ===
Genus Kickxia:

- Kickxia elatine (L.) Dumort. subsp. elatine, not indigenous, naturalised
- Kickxia spuria (L.) Dumort. not indigenous, naturalised
  - Kickxia spuria (L.) Dumort. subsp. spuria, not indigenous, naturalised

=== Limnophila ===
Genus Limnophila:

- Limnophila indica (L.) Druce, indigenous

=== Linaria ===
Genus Linaria:

- Linaria dalmatica (L.) Mill. not indigenous, naturalised, invasive
- Linaria genistifolia (L.) Mill. subsp. genistifolia, not indigenous, naturalised
- Linaria maroccana Hook.f. not indigenous, naturalised
- Linaria spuria (L.) Mill. accepted as Kickxia spuria (L.) Dumort. subsp. spuria, not indigenous, naturalised
- Linaria vulgaris Mill. not indigenous, naturalised, invasive

=== Misopates ===
Genus Misopates:

- Misopates orontium (L.) Raf. subsp. orontium, not indigenous, naturalised, invasive

=== Plantago ===
Genus Plantago:

- Plantago afra L. not indigenous, naturalised
- Plantago aristata Michx. not indigenous, naturalised
- Plantago bigelovii A.Gray, not indigenous, naturalised
- Plantago cafra Decne. indigenous
- Plantago coronopus L. not indigenous, naturalised
- Plantago crassifolia Forssk. indigenous
  - Plantago crassifolia Forssk. var. crassifolia, indigenous
  - Plantago crassifolia Forssk. var. hirsuta (Thunb.) Beg. endemic
- Plantago lanceolata L. indigenous
- Plantago laxiflora Decne. endemic
- Plantago longissima Decne. indigenous
- Plantago major L. not indigenous, naturalised
- Plantago myosuros Lam. not indigenous, naturalised
- Plantago remota Lam. endemic
- Plantago rhodosperma Decne. not indigenous, naturalised
- Plantago virginica L. not indigenous, naturalised

=== Scoparia ===
Genus Scoparia:

- Scoparia dulcis L. not indigenous, naturalised

=== Veronica ===
Genus Veronica:

- Veronica agrestis L. not indigenous, naturalised
- Veronica anagallis-aquatica L. indigenous
- Veronica arvensis L. not indigenous, naturalised
- Veronica beccabunga L. not indigenous, naturalised
- Veronica chamaedrys L. subsp. chamaedrys, not indigenous, naturalised
- Veronica hederifolia L. not indigenous, naturalised
- Veronica officinalis L. not indigenous, naturalised
- Veronica persica Poir. not indigenous, naturalised
- Veronica serpyllifolia L. not indigenous, naturalised

== Scrophulariaceae ==
Family: Scrophulariaceae,

- Genus Agathelpis:
- Genus Alonsoa:
- Genus Antherothamnus:
- Genus Anticharis:
- Genus Aptosimum:
- Genus Buddleja:
- Genus Capraria:
- Genus Chaenostoma:
- Genus Chamaecrypta:
- Genus Chenopodiopsis:
- Genus Colpias:
- Genus Cromidon:
- Genus Dermatobotrys:
- Genus Diascia:
- Genus Diclis:
- Genus Dischisma:
- Genus Freylinia:
- Genus Glekia:
- Genus Globulariopsis:
- Genus Glumicalyx:
- Genus Gomphostigma:
- Genus Gosela:
- Genus Gratiola:
- Genus Hebenstretia:
- Genus Hemimeris:
- Genus Jamesbrittenia:
- Genus Limosella:
- Genus Lyperia:
- Genus Manulea:
- Genus Melanospermum:
- Genus Microdon:
- Genus Myoporum:
- Genus Nemesia:
- Genus Nemia:
- Genus Oftia:
- Genus Peliostomum:
- Genus Phygelius:
- Genus Phyllopodium:
- Genus Polycarena:
- Genus Pseudoselago:
- Genus Reyemia:
- Genus Selago:
- Genus Sphenandra:
- Genus Strobilopsis:
- Genus Sutera:
- Genus Teedia:
- Genus Tetraselago:
- Genus Trieenea:
- Genus Verbascum:
- Genus Walafrida:
- Genus Zaluzianskya:

== Stilbaceae ==
Family: Stilbaceae,

=== Anastrabe ===
Genus Anastrabe:

- Anastrabe integerrima E.Mey. ex Benth. endemic

=== Bowkeria ===
Genus Bowkeria:

- Bowkeria citrina Thode, endemic
- Bowkeria cymosa MacOwan, indigenous
- Bowkeria verticillata (Eckl. & Zeyh.) Schinz, indigenous

=== Campylostachys ===
Genus Campylostachys:

- Campylostachys cernua (L.f.) Kunth, endemic
- Campylostachys helmei J.C.Manning & Goldblatt, indigenous

=== Charadrophila ===
Genus Charadrophila:

- Charadrophila capensis Marloth, endemic

=== Eurylobium ===
Genus Eurylobium:

- Eurylobium serrulatum Hochst. accepted as Stilbe serrulata Hochst. present

=== Euthystachys ===
Genus Euthystachys:

- Euthystachys abbreviata (E.Mey.) A.DC. endemic

=== Halleria ===
Genus Halleria:

- Halleria elliptica Thunb. endemic
- Halleria lucida L. indigenous
- Halleria ovata Benth. endemic

=== Ixianthes ===
Genus Ixianthes:

- Ixianthes retzioides Benth. endemic

=== Kogelbergia ===
Genus Kogelbergia:

- Kogelbergia phylicoides (A.DC.) Rourke, endemic
- Kogelbergia verticillata (Eckl. & Zeyh.) Rourke, endemic

=== Nuxia ===
Genus Nuxia:

- Nuxia congesta R.Br. ex Fresen. indigenous
- Nuxia floribunda Benth. indigenous
- Nuxia glomerulata (C.A.Sm.) I.Verd. endemic
- Nuxia gracilis Engl. endemic
- Nuxia oppositifolia (Hochst.) Benth. indigenous

=== Retzia ===
Genus Retzia:

- Retzia capensis Thunb. endemic

=== Stilbe ===
Genus Stilbe:

- Stilbe albiflora E.Mey. endemic
- Stilbe chorisepala Suess. accepted as Kogelbergia verticillata (Eckl. & Zeyh.) Rourke, present
- Stilbe ericoides (L.) L. endemic
- Stilbe gymnopharyngia (Rourke) Rourke, endemic
- Stilbe mucronata N.E.Br. accepted as Kogelbergia verticillata (Eckl. & Zeyh.) Rourke, present
- Stilbe overbergensis Rourke, endemic
- Stilbe phylicoides A.DC. accepted as Kogelbergia phylicoides (A.DC.) Rourke, present
- Stilbe rupestris Compton, endemic
- Stilbe serrulata Hochst. endemic
- Stilbe vestita P.J.Bergius, endemic

=== Thesmophora ===
Genus Thesmophora:

- Thesmophora scopulosa Rourke, endemic

=== Xeroplana ===
Genus Xeroplana:

- Xeroplana gymnopharyngia Rourke, accepted as Stilbe gymnopharyngia (Rourke) Rourke, present
- Xeroplana zeyheri Briq. accepted as Stilbe overbergensis Rourke, present

== Verbenaceae ==
Family: Verbenaceae,

=== Aloysia ===
Genus Aloysia:

- Aloysia citrodora Palau, not indigenous, cultivated, naturalised

=== Bouchea ===
Genus Bouchea:

- Bouchea glandulifera H.Pearson, accepted as Chascanum garipense E.Mey. present
- Bouchea schlechteri Gurke, accepted as Chascanum schlechteri (Gurke) Moldenke, present
- Bouchea wilmsii Gurke, accepted as Chascanum hederaceum (Sond.) Moldenke var. natalense (H.Pearson) Moldenke, present

=== Chascanum ===
Genus Chascanum:

- Chascanum adenostachyum (Schauer) Moldenke, indigenous
- Chascanum caespitosum (H.Pearson) Moldenke, endemic
- Chascanum cernuum (L.) E.Mey. endemic
- Chascanum cuneifolium (L.f.) E.Mey. endemic
- Chascanum garipense E.Mey. indigenous
- Chascanum hederaceum (Sond.) Moldenke, indigenous
  - Chascanum hederaceum (Sond.) Moldenke var. hederaceum, indigenous
  - Chascanum hederaceum (Sond.) Moldenke var. natalense (H.Pearson) Moldenke, indigenous
- Chascanum incisum (H.Pearson) Moldenke, indigenous
- Chascanum integrifolium (H.Pearson) Moldenke, endemic
- Chascanum krookii (Gurke ex Zahlbr.) Moldenke, endemic
- Chascanum latifolium (Harv.) Moldenke, indigenous
  - Chascanum latifolium (Harv.) Moldenke var. glabrescens (H.Pearson) Moldenke, indigenous
  - Chascanum latifolium (Harv.) Moldenke var. latifolium, endemic
  - Chascanum latifolium (Harv.) Moldenke var. transvaalense Moldenke, indigenous
- Chascanum namaquanum (Bolus ex H.Pearson) Moldenke, indigenous
- Chascanum pinnatifidum (L.f.) E.Mey. indigenous
  - Chascanum pinnatifidum (L.f.) E.Mey. var. pinnatifidum, indigenous
  - Chascanum pinnatifidum (L.f.) E.Mey. var. racemosum Schinz ex Moldenke, endemic
- Chascanum pumilum E.Mey. indigenous
- Chascanum schlechteri (Gurke) Moldenke, indigenous
  - Chascanum schlechteri (Gurke) Moldenke var. schlecteri, indigenous

=== Duranta ===
Genus Duranta:

- Duranta erecta L. not indigenous, naturalised, invasive

=== Lantana ===
Genus Lantana:

- Lantana camara L. not indigenous, cultivated, naturalised, invasive
- Lantana mearnsii Moldenke, indigenous
  - Lantana mearnsii Moldenke var. latibracteolata Moldenke, indigenous
- Lantana rugosa Thunb. indigenous
- Lantana trifolia L. not indigenous, naturalised

=== Lippia ===
Genus Lippia:

- Lippia javanica (Burm.f.) Spreng. indigenous
- Lippia pretoriensis H.Pearson, indigenous
- Lippia rehmannii H.Pearson, indigenous
- Lippia scaberrima Sond. indigenous
- Lippia wilmsii H.Pearson, indigenous

=== Phyla ===
Genus Phyla:

- Phyla nodiflora (L.) Greene var. nodiflora, not indigenous, naturalised
  - Phyla nodiflora (L.) Greene var. rosea (D.Don) Moldenke, not indigenous, naturalised

=== Plexipus ===
Genus Plexipus:

- Plexipus adenostachyus (Schauer) R.Fern. accepted as Chascanum adenostachyum (Schauer) Moldenke, present
- Plexipus caespitosus (H.Pearson) R.Fern. accepted as Chascanum caespitosum (H.Pearson) Moldenke, present
- Plexipus cernuus (L.) R.Fern. accepted as Chascanum cernuum (L.) E.Mey. present
- Plexipus cuneifolius (L.f.) Raf. accepted as Chascanum cuneifolium (L.f.) E.Mey. present
- Plexipus garipensis (E.Mey.) R.Fern. accepted as Chascanum garipense E.Mey. present
- Plexipus hederaceus (Sond.) R.Fern. var. hederaceus, accepted as Chascanum hederaceum (Sond.) Moldenke var. hederaceum, present
  - Plexipus hederaceus (Sond.) R.Fern. var. natalensis (H.Pearson) R.Fern. accepted as Chascanum hederaceum (Sond.) Moldenke var. natalense (H.Pearson) Moldenke, present
- Plexipus incisus (H.Pearson) R.Fern. accepted as Chascanum incisum (H.Pearson) Moldenke, present
- Plexipus integrifolius (H.Pearson) R.Fern. accepted as Chascanum integrifolium (H.Pearson) Moldenke, present
- Plexipus krookii (Gurke ex Zahlbr.) R.Fern. accepted as Chascanum krookii (Gurke ex Zahlbr.) Moldenke, present
- Plexipus latifolius (Harv.) R.Fern. var. glabrescens (H.Pearson) R.Fern. accepted as Chascanum latifolium (Harv.) Moldenke var. glabrescens (H.Pearson) Moldenke, present
  - Plexipus latifolius (Harv.) R.Fern. var. latifolius, accepted as Chascanum latifolium (Harv.) Moldenke var. latifolium, present
  - Plexipus latifolius (Harv.) R.Fern. var. transvaalensis (Moldenke) R.Fern. accepted as Chascanum latifolium (Harv.) Moldenke var. transvaalense Moldenke, present
- Plexipus namaquanus (Bolus ex H.Pearson) R.Fern. accepted as Chascanum namaquanum (Bolus ex H.Pearson) Moldenke, present
- Plexipus pinnatifidus (L.f.) R.Fern. var. pinnatifidus, accepted as Chascanum pinnatifidum (L.f.) E.Mey. var. pinnatifidum, present
  - Plexipus pinnatifidus (L.f.) R.Fern. var. racemosus (Schinz ex Moldenke) R.Fern. accepted as Chascanum pinnatifidum (L.f.) E.Mey. var. racemosum Schinz ex Moldenke, present
- Plexipus pumilus (E.Mey.) R.Fern. accepted as Chascanum pumilum E.Mey. present
- Plexipus schlechteri (Gurke) R.Fern. var. schlechteri, accepted as Chascanum schlechteri (Gurke) Moldenke, present

=== Priva ===
Genus Priva:

- Priva abyssinica Jaub. & Spach, accepted as Priva adhaerens (Forssk.) Chiov. indigenous
- Priva adhaerens (Forssk.) Chiov. indigenous
- Priva africana Moldenke, indigenous
- Priva cordifolia (L.f.) Druce var. abyssinica (Jaub. & Spach) Moldenke, accepted as Priva adhaerens (Forssk.) Chiov. indigenous
  - Priva cordifolia (L.f.) Druce var. australis Moldenke, accepted as Priva flabelliformis (Moldenke) R.Fern. indigenous
  - Priva cordifolia (L.f.) Druce var. flabelliformis Moldenke, accepted as Priva flabelliformis (Moldenke) R.Fern. indigenous
- Priva flabelliformis (Moldenke) R.Fern. indigenous
- Priva meyeri Jaub. & Spach, indigenous
  - Priva meyeri Jaub. & Spach var. meyeri, indigenous

=== Stachytarpheta ===
Genus Stachytarpheta:

- Stachytarpheta cayennensis (Rich.) Vahl, not indigenous, naturalised, invasive
- Stachytarpheta mutabilis (Jacq.) Vahl, not indigenous, naturalised, invasive
- Stachytarpheta urticifolia (Salisb.) Sims, not indigenous, naturalised

=== Verbena ===
Genus Verbena:

- Verbena aristigera S.Moore, not indigenous, naturalised
- Verbena bonariensis L. not indigenous, naturalised, invasive
- Verbena brasiliensis Vell. not indigenous, naturalised, invasive
- Verbena incompta P.W.Michael, not indigenous, naturalised, invasive
- Verbena litoralis Humb. Bonpl. & Kunth, not indigenous, naturalised
- Verbena officinalis L. not indigenous, naturalised
  - Verbena officinalis L. subsp. africana R.Fern. & Verdc. indigenous
- Verbena rigida Spreng. not indigenous, naturalised, invasive
- Verbena tenuisecta Briq. accepted as Verbena aristigera S.Moore, not indigenous, naturalised
- Verbena venosa Gillies & Hook. accepted as Verbena rigida Spreng. not indigenous, naturalised
