= Harveya =

Harveya may refer to:

- Harveya (plant), a saprophyte genus
- Harveya (moth), a moth genus
