= Strobilopsis =

Scientific classification
- Kingdom: Plantae
- Clade: Tracheophytes
- Clade: Angiosperms
- Clade: Eudicots
- Clade: Asterids
- Order: Lamiales
- Family: Scrophulariaceae
- Genus: Strobilopsis; Hilliard & B.L.Burtt

Genus of plants

Strobilopsis is a genus of flowering plants belonging to the family Scrophulariaceae.

Its native range is Southern Africa.

== Species ==
Species:

- Strobilopsis wrightii Hilliard & B.L.Burtt
