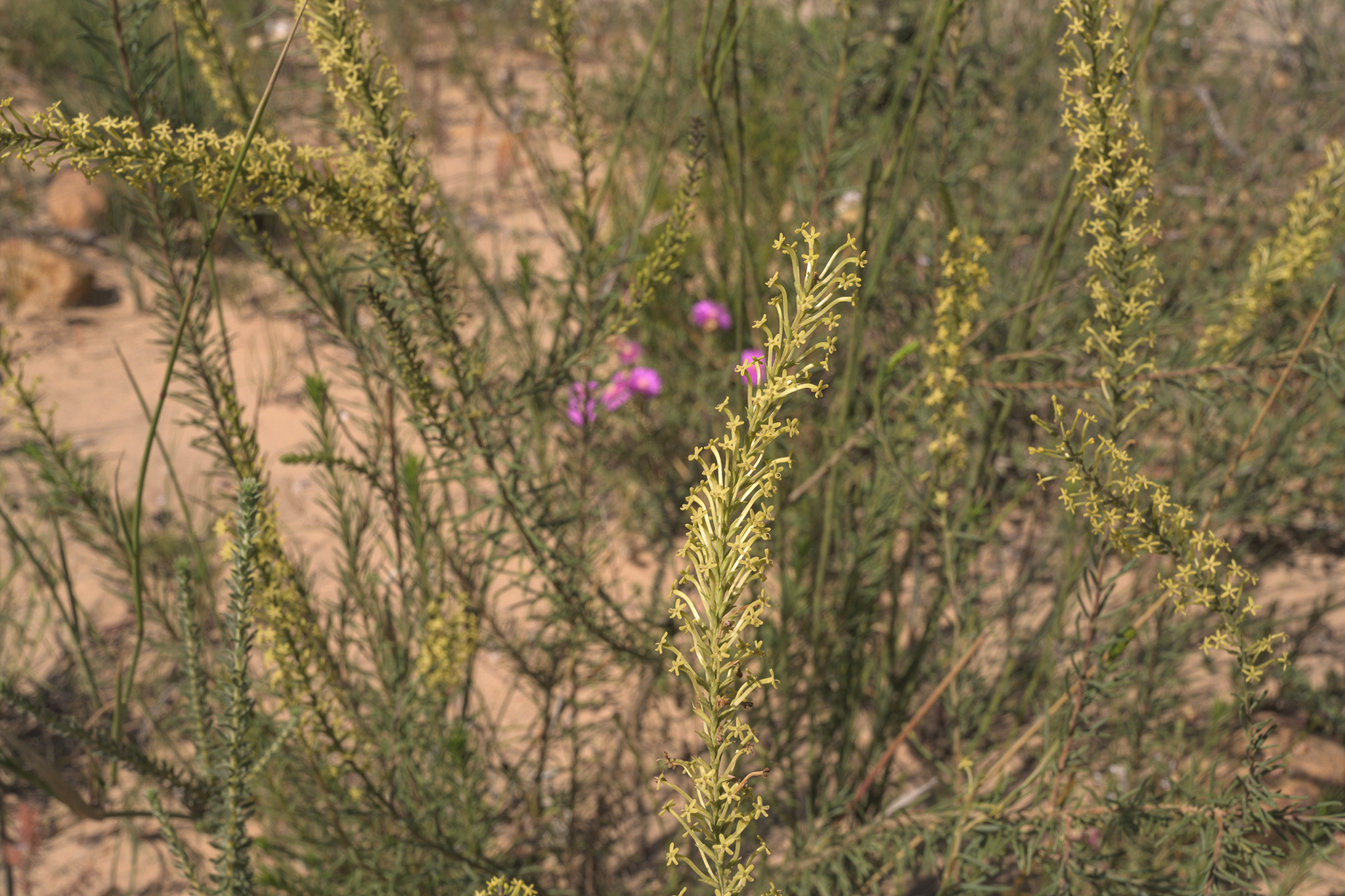
- Microdon dubius

Scientific classification
- Kingdom: Plantae
- Clade: Tracheophytes
- Clade: Angiosperms
- Clade: Eudicots
- Clade: Asterids
- Order: Lamiales
- Family: Scrophulariaceae
- Tribe: Limoselleae
- Genus: Microdon; Choisy (1824)

Synonyms
- Dalea Gaertn. (1788), nom. illeg.

= Microdon (plant) =

Genus of flowering plants

Microdon is a genus of flowering plants in the family Scrophulariaceae. It includes seven species of subshrubs or shrubs native to the Cape Provinces of South Africa.

== Species ==
Seven species are accepted:

- Microdon capitatus (P.J.Bergius) Levyns
- Microdon dubius (L.) Hilliard
- Microdon linearis Choisy
- Microdon nitidus (E.Mey.) Hilliard
- Microdon orbicularis Choisy
- Microdon parviflorus (P.J.Bergius) Hilliard
- Microdon polygaloides (L.f.) Druce
