= Thesmophora =

Scientific classification
- Kingdom: Plantae
- Clade: Tracheophytes
- Clade: Angiosperms
- Clade: Eudicots
- Clade: Asterids
- Order: Lamiales
- Family: Stilbaceae
- Genus: Thesmophora; Rourke
- Species: T. scopulosa

Binomial name
- Thesmophora scopulosa Rourke

Genus of flowering plants

Thesmophora is a genus of flowering plants in the family Stilbaceae described as a genus in 1993.

There is only one known species, Thesmophora scopulosa, native to the Cape Province region in South Africa.

== See also ==
- John Patrick Rourke
