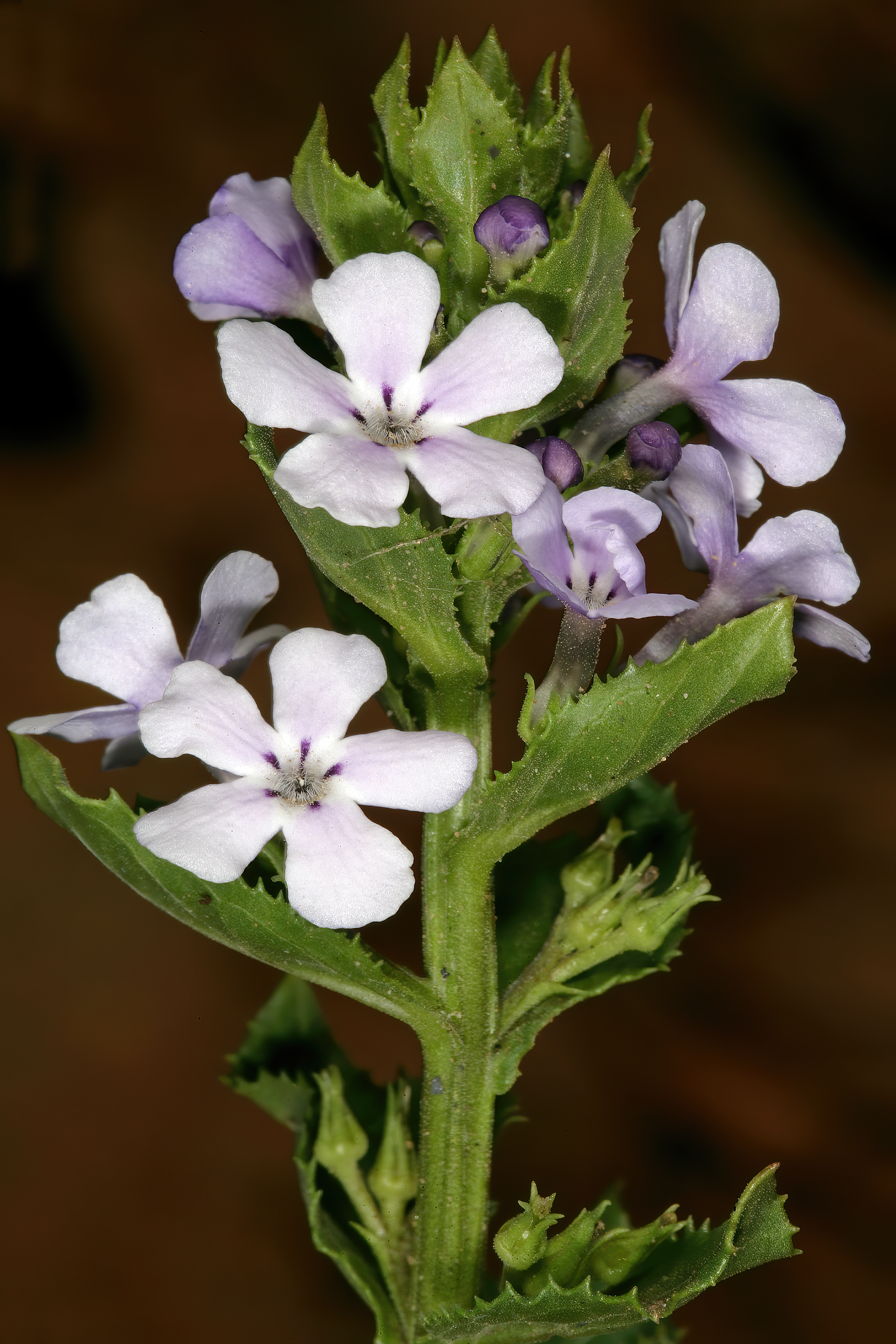
- Teedia lucida in South Africa

Scientific classification
- Kingdom: Plantae
- Clade: Tracheophytes
- Clade: Angiosperms
- Clade: Eudicots
- Clade: Asterids
- Order: Lamiales
- Family: Scrophulariaceae
- Tribe: Teedieae
- Genus: Teedia; Rudolphi

Synonyms
- Borckhausenia Roth

= Teedia =

Genus of flowering plants

Teedia is a genus of flowering plants belonging to the family Scrophulariaceae.

Its native range is southern tropical Africa (within the countries of Lesotho, Eswatini and Zimbabwe) and South Africa (within the regions of Cape Provinces, KwaZulu-Natal and the Northern Provinces).

The genus name of Teedia is in honour of Johann Georg Teede, a German botanist who collected plants in Portugal. It was first described and published in J. Bot. (Schrader) 1799 (Vol.2) on page 288 in 1800.

== Known species ==
According to Kew:

- Teedia lucida (Aiton) Rudolphi
- Teedia pubescens Burch.
