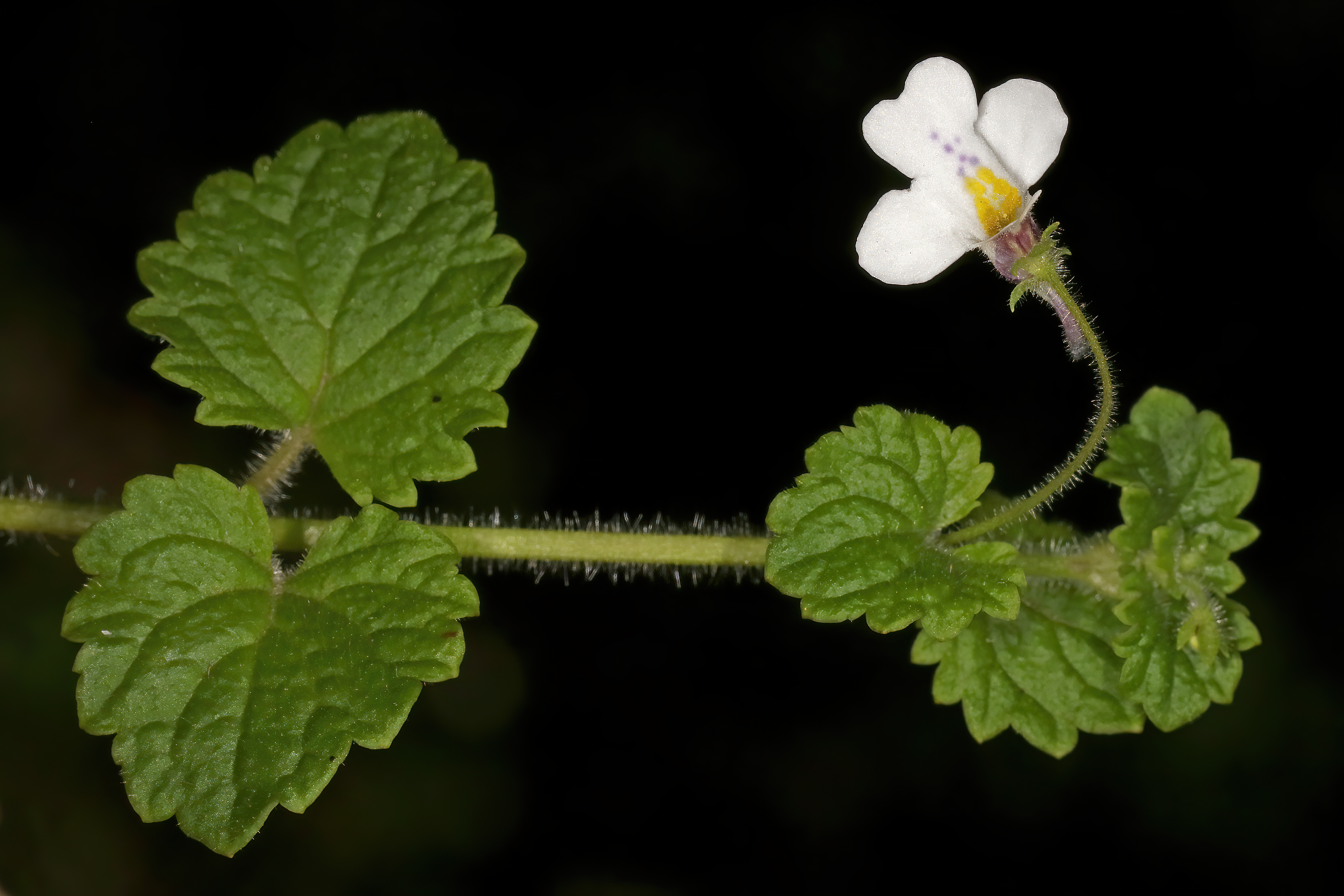
- Diclis reptans

Scientific classification
- Kingdom: Plantae
- Clade: Tracheophytes
- Clade: Angiosperms
- Clade: Eudicots
- Clade: Asterids
- Order: Lamiales
- Family: Scrophulariaceae
- Genus: Diclis; Benth.

= Diclis =

Genus of plants

Diclis is a genus of flowering plants belonging to the family Scrophulariaceae.

Its native range is Tropical Africa, Western Indian Ocean.

Species:

- Diclis bambuseti R.E.Fr.
- Diclis ovata Benth.
- Diclis petiolaris Benth.
- Diclis reptans Benth.
- Diclis rotundifolia (Hiern) Hilliard & B.L.Burtt
- Diclis sessilifolia Diels
- Diclis stellarioides Hiern
- Diclis tenella Hemsl.
- Diclis tenuissima Pilg.
