= Agathelpis =

Scientific classification
- Kingdom: Plantae
- Clade: Tracheophytes
- Clade: Angiosperms
- Clade: Eudicots
- Clade: Asterids
- Order: Lamiales
- Family: Plantaginaceae
- Genus: Agathelpis; Choisy

Genus of plants

Agathelpis is a genus of flowering plants belonging to the family Plantaginaceae.

Its native range is South African Republic.

Species:

- Agathelpis adunca E.Mey.
- Agathelpis brevifolia E.Mey.
- Agathelpis mucronata E.Mey.
