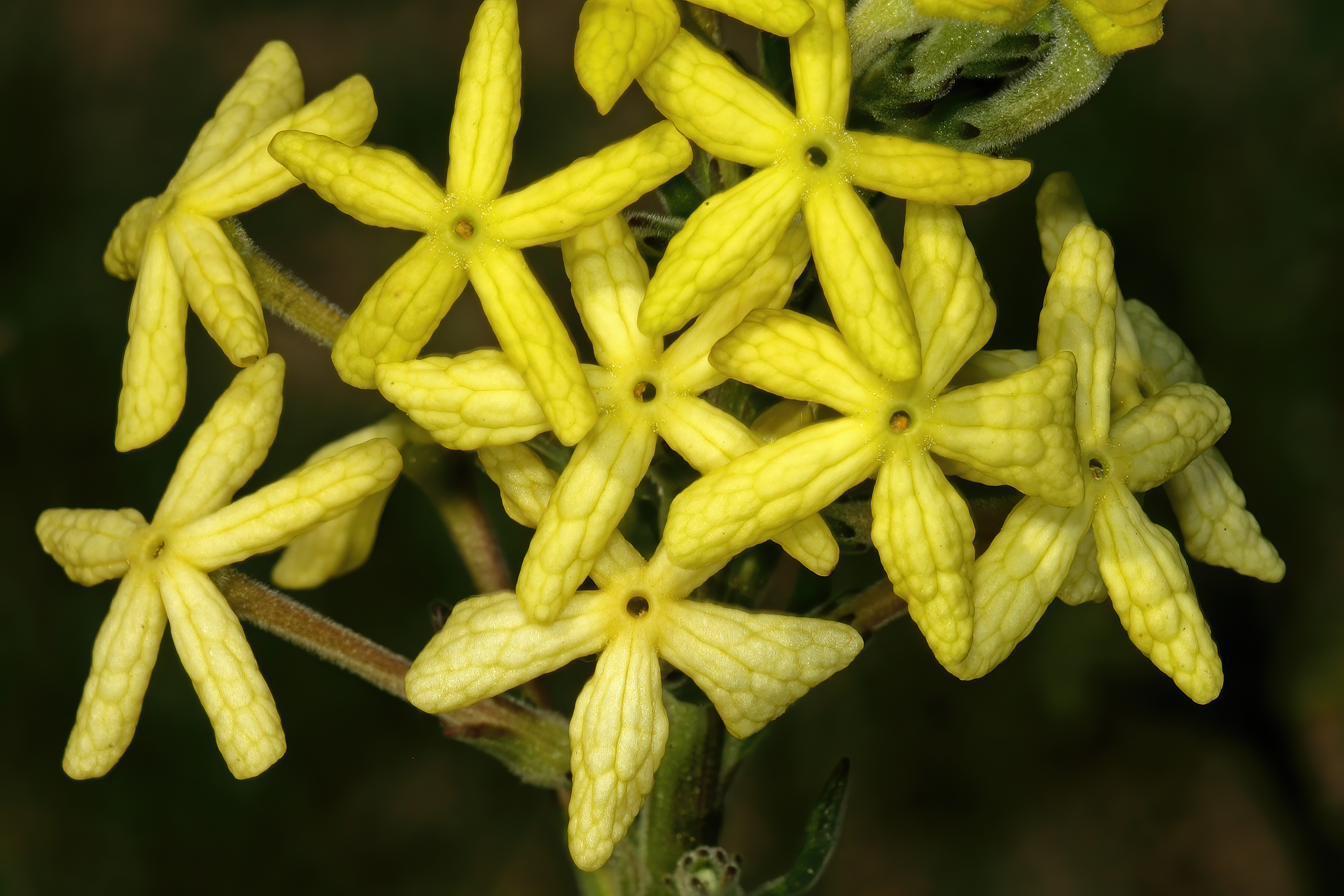
- Lyperia lychnidea

Scientific classification
- Kingdom: Plantae
- Clade: Tracheophytes
- Clade: Angiosperms
- Clade: Eudicots
- Clade: Asterids
- Order: Lamiales
- Family: Scrophulariaceae
- Genus: Lyperia; Benth. (1836)

Species
- six; see text

= Lyperia =

Genus of flowering plants

Lyperia is a genus of flowering plants in the family Scrophulariaceae. It includes six species native to Namibia and the Cape Provinces of South Africa.

== Species ==
Six species are accepted.

- Lyperia antirrhinoides (L.f.) Hilliard
- Lyperia formosa Hilliard
- Lyperia lychnidea (L.) Druce
- Lyperia tenuiflora Benth.
- Lyperia tristis (L.f.) Benth.
- Lyperia violacea Benth.
