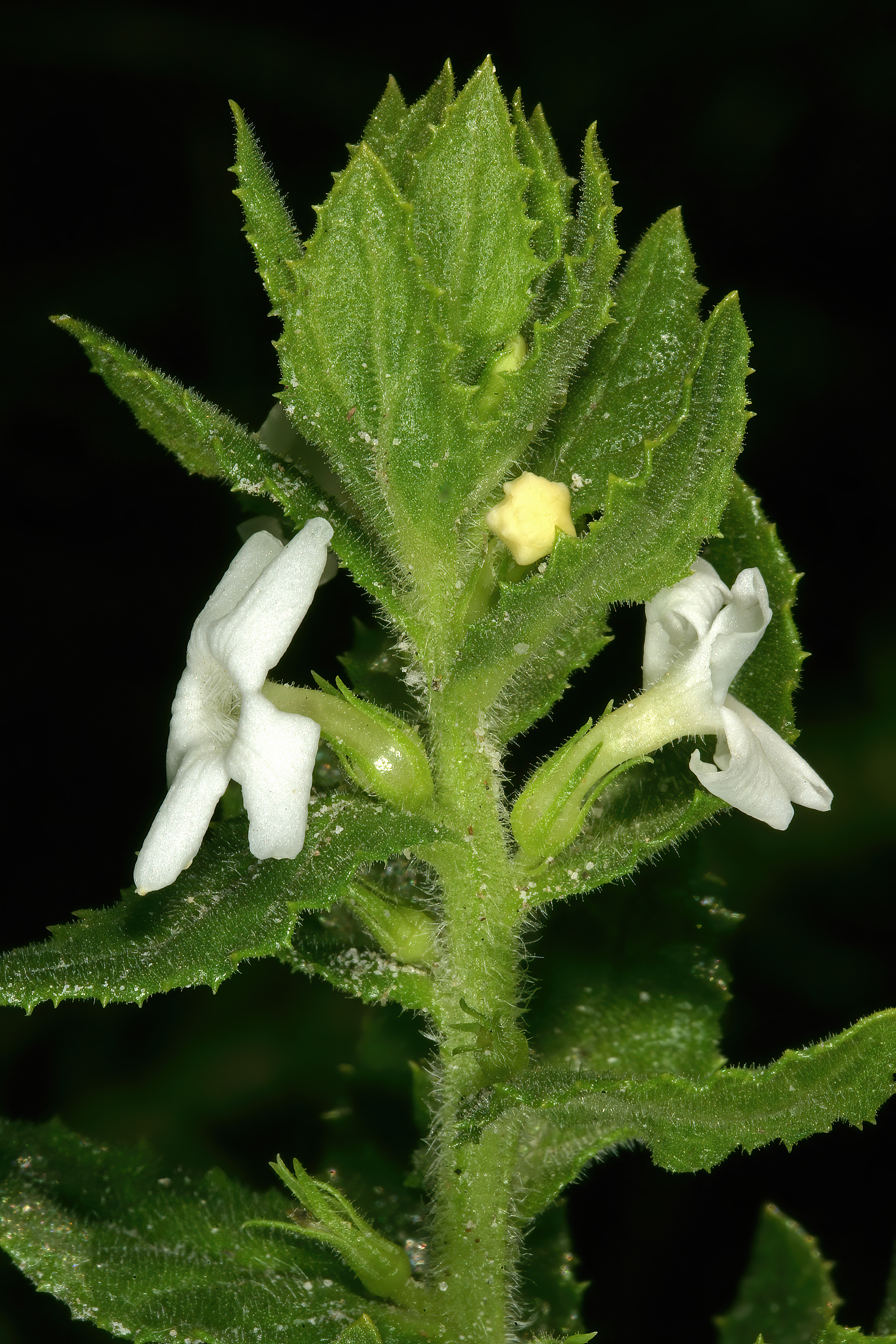

Scientific classification
- Kingdom: Plantae
- Clade: Tracheophytes
- Clade: Angiosperms
- Clade: Eudicots
- Clade: Asterids
- Order: Lamiales
- Family: Scrophulariaceae
- Genus: Oftia; Adans.

= Oftia =

Genus of flowering plants

Oftia is a genus of flowering plants belonging to the family Scrophulariaceae.

Its native range is South Africa.

== Species ==
Species:

- Oftia africana (L.) Bocq. ex Baill.
- Oftia glabra Compton
- Oftia revoluta (E.Mey.) Bocq. ex Baill.
