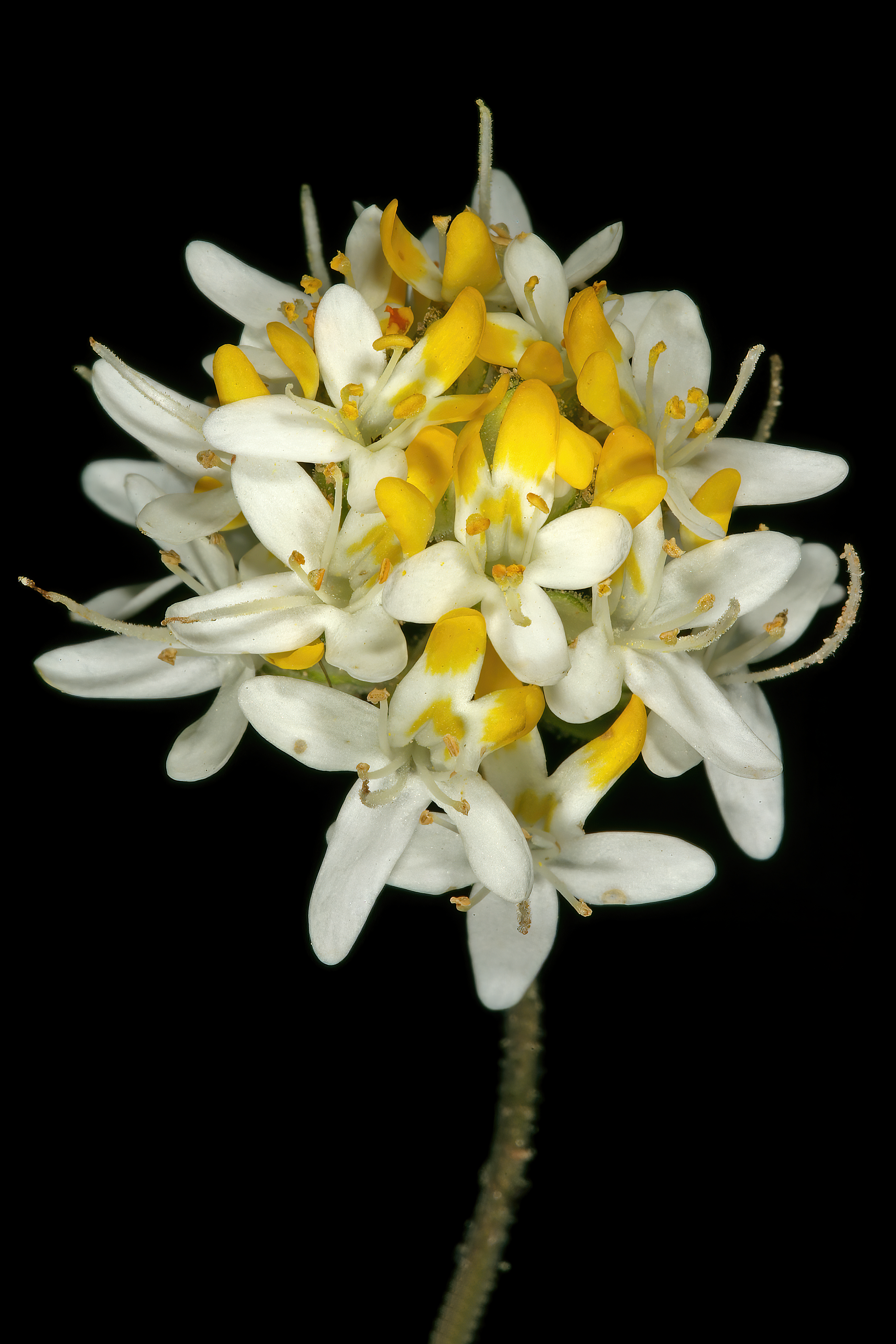
- Polycarena aurea

Scientific classification
- Kingdom: Plantae
- Clade: Tracheophytes
- Clade: Angiosperms
- Clade: Eudicots
- Clade: Asterids
- Order: Lamiales
- Family: Scrophulariaceae
- Genus: Polycarena; Benth.

= Polycarena =

Genus of flowering plants

Polycarena is a genus of flowering plants belonging to the family Scrophulariaceae.

Its native range is Namibia and South African Republic.

Species:

- Polycarena aemulans Hilliard
- Polycarena aurea Benth.
