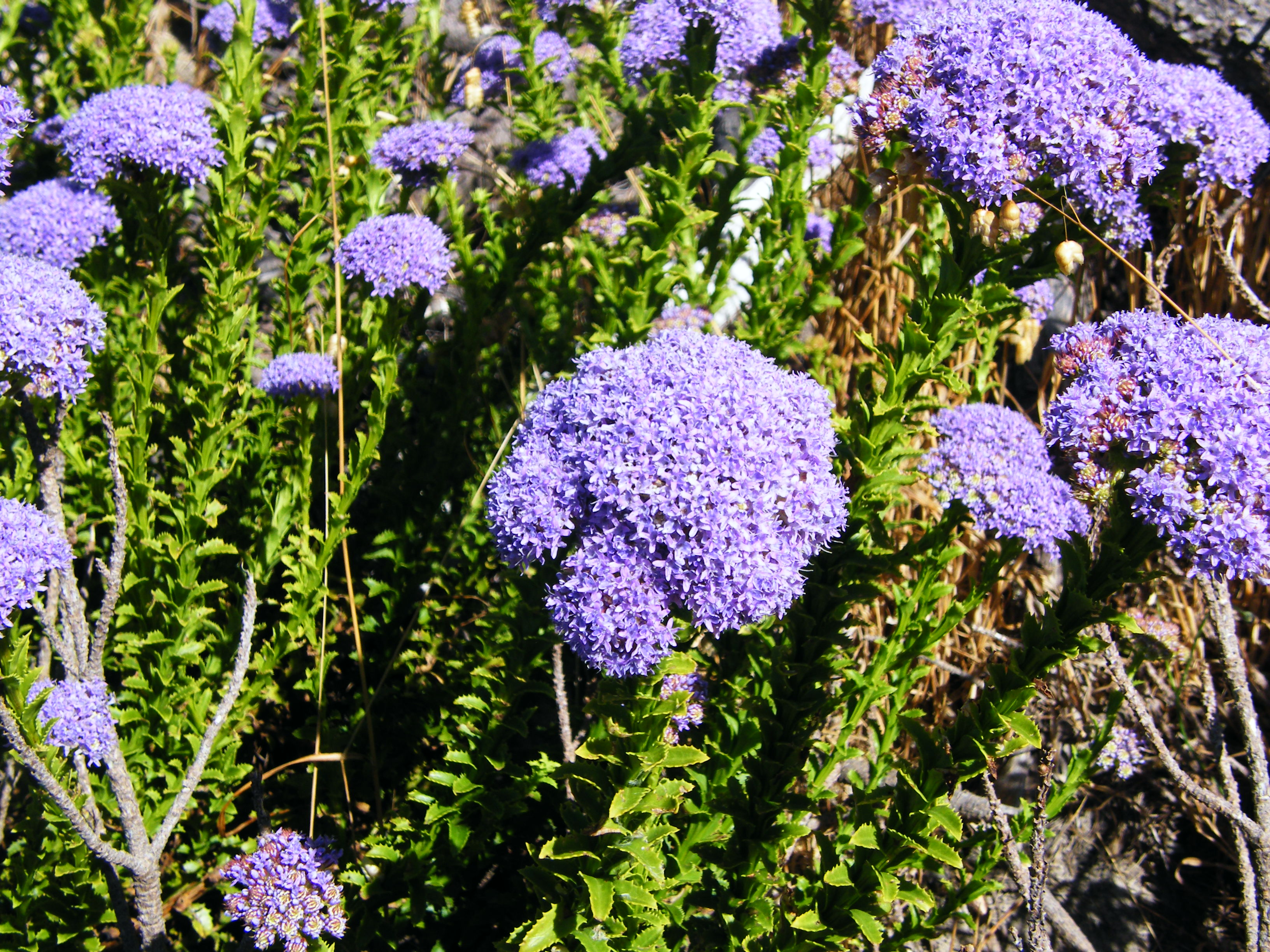
- Pseudoselago serrata

Scientific classification
- Kingdom: Plantae
- Clade: Tracheophytes
- Clade: Angiosperms
- Clade: Eudicots
- Clade: Asterids
- Order: Lamiales
- Family: Scrophulariaceae
- Genus: Pseudoselago; Hilliard

= Pseudoselago =

Genus of plants

Pseudoselago is a genus of flowering plants belonging to the family Scrophulariaceae.

Its native range is South African Republic.

Species:

- Pseudoselago arguta (E.Mey.) Hilliard
- Pseudoselago ascendens (E.Mey.) Hilliard
- Pseudoselago bella Hilliard
- Pseudoselago burmanni (Choisy) Hilliard
- Pseudoselago caerulescens Hilliard
- Pseudoselago candida Hilliard
- Pseudoselago densifolia (Hochst.) Hilliard
- Pseudoselago diplotricha Hilliard
- Pseudoselago gracilis Hilliard
- Pseudoselago guttata (E.Mey.) Hilliard
- Pseudoselago hilliardiae J.C.Manning & Goldblatt
- Pseudoselago humilis (Rolfe) Hilliard
- Pseudoselago langebergensis Hilliard
- Pseudoselago outeniquensis Hilliard
- Pseudoselago parvifolia Hilliard
- Pseudoselago peninsulae Hilliard
- Pseudoselago prolixa Hilliard
- Pseudoselago prostrata Hilliard
- Pseudoselago pulchra Hilliard
- Pseudoselago quadrangularis (Choisy) Hilliard
- Pseudoselago rapunculoides (L.) Hilliard
- Pseudoselago recurvifolia Hilliard
- Pseudoselago serrata (P.J.Bergius) Hilliard
- Pseudoselago similis Hilliard
- Pseudoselago spuria (L.) Hilliard
- Pseudoselago subglabra Hilliard
- Pseudoselago verbenacea (L.f.) Hilliard
- Pseudoselago violacea Hilliard
