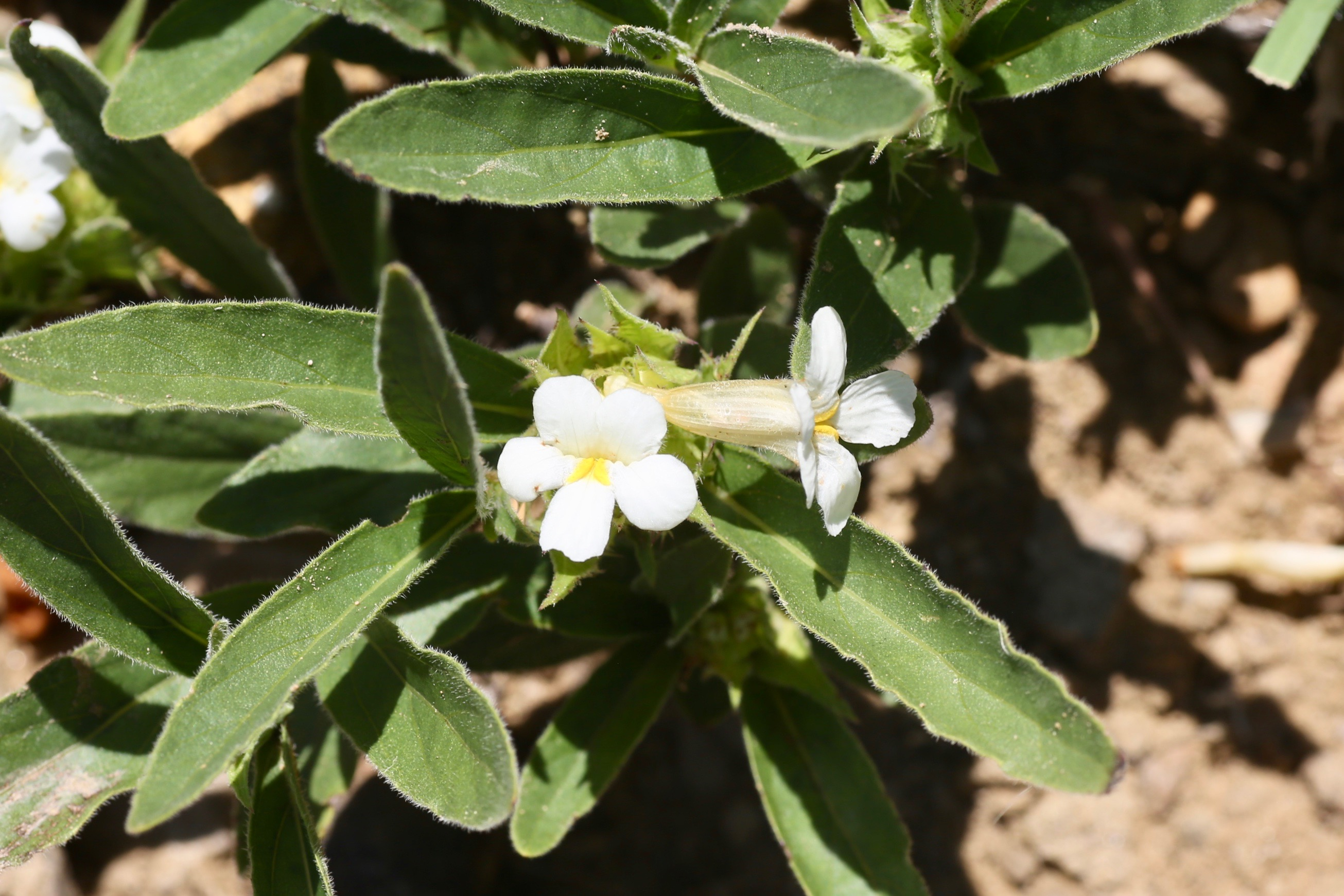
- Crabbea nana

Scientific classification
- Kingdom: Plantae
- Clade: Tracheophytes
- Clade: Angiosperms
- Clade: Eudicots
- Clade: Asterids
- Order: Lamiales
- Family: Acanthaceae
- Subfamily: Acanthoideae
- Tribe: Barlerieae
- Genus: Crabbea; Harv. (1842), nom. cons.

Synonyms
- Acanthostelma Bidgood & Brummitt; Golaea Chiov.

= Crabbea =

Genus of flowering plants

Crabbea is a genus of flowering plants native to eastern and southern Africa. They are generally low-growing perennial herbs. The five-petaled flowers are surrounded by prickly bracts.

The small leaves of some species of Crabbea are used as part of a Xhosa food called imifino (boiled leaf vegetables), or as a condiment or relish to accompany grains. A Xhosa common name for these plants is krakrisa.

As of 2020, there are 13 accepted species in the genus:

- Crabbea acaulis N.E.Br.
- Crabbea albolutea Thulin
- Crabbea cirsioides (Nees) Nees
- Crabbea coerulea Vollesen
- Crabbea glandulosa Vollesen
- Crabbea kaessneri S.Moore
- Crabbea longipes Mildbr.
- Crabbea migiurtina (Chiov.) Thulin
- Crabbea nana (Nees) Nees
- Crabbea pinnatifida Thulin
- Crabbea thymifolia (Chiov.) Thulin
- Crabbea velutina S.Moore
- Crabbea zambiana Vollesen
