= Cromidon =

Scientific classification
- Kingdom: Plantae
- Clade: Tracheophytes
- Clade: Angiosperms
- Clade: Eudicots
- Clade: Asterids
- Order: Lamiales
- Family: Scrophulariaceae
- Genus: Cromidon; Compton

Genus of flowering plants

Cromidon is a genus of flowering plants belonging to the family Scrophulariaceae.

Its native range is Southern Africa.

Species:

- Cromidon austerum Hilliard
- Cromidon confusum Hilliard
- Cromidon corrigioloides (Rolfe) Compton
- Cromidon decumbens (Thunb.) Hilliard
- Cromidon dregei Hilliard
- Cromidon gracile Hilliard
- Cromidon hamulosum (E.Mey.) Hilliard
- Cromidon microechinos Hilliard
- Cromidon minutum (Rolfe) Hilliard
- Cromidon plantaginis (L.f.) Hilliard
- Cromidon pusillum (Roessler) Hilliard
- Cromidon varicalyx Hilliard
