= Charadrophila =

Scientific classification
- Kingdom: Plantae
- Clade: Tracheophytes
- Clade: Angiosperms
- Clade: Eudicots
- Clade: Asterids
- Order: Lamiales
- Family: Stilbaceae
- Genus: Charadrophila; Marloth
- Species: C. capensis

Binomial name
- Charadrophila capensis Marloth

Genus of flowering plants

Charadrophila is a genus of flowering plants in the family Stilbaceae described as a genus in 1899. There is only one known species, Charadrophila capensis, native to the Cape Province region of South Africa.
