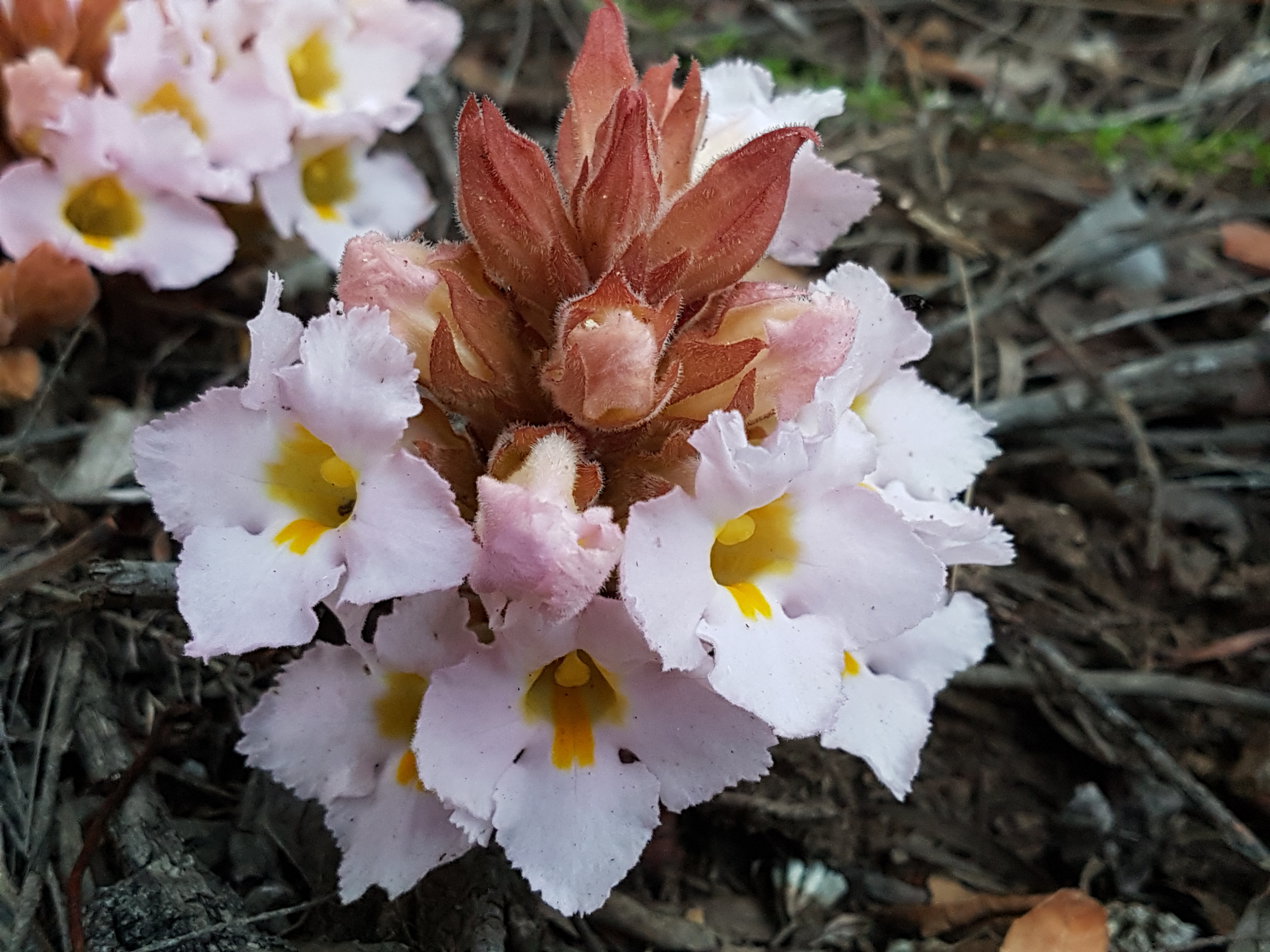

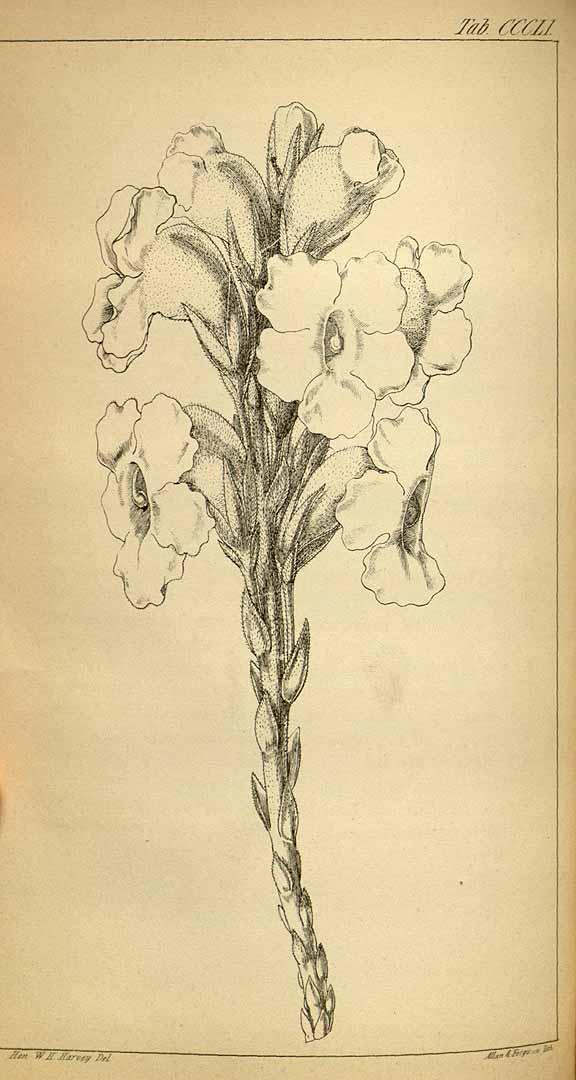
- Plate from Hooker’s Icones Plantarum

Scientific classification
- Kingdom: Plantae
- Clade: Tracheophytes
- Clade: Angiosperms
- Clade: Eudicots
- Clade: Asterids
- Order: Lamiales
- Family: Orobanchaceae
- Genus: Harveya
- Species: H. purpurea

Binomial name
- Harveya purpurea Harv.

Synonyms
- Aulaya grandiflora Benth.; Aulaya purpurea (L.f.) Benth.; Gerardia orobanchoides Lam.; Harveya laxiflora Hiern; Orobanche pratensis Eckl. & Zeyh. ex C.Presl; Orobanche uitenhagensis Eckl. ex Hook.; Orobanche purpurea L. f.

= Harveya purpurea =

Species of flowering plant

Harveya purpurea is an annual herb with large, showy flowers and scale-like leaves, parasitic on the roots of shrubs and trees, endemic to South Africa in the Eastern and Western Cape. It occurs from the Cederberg to the Cape Peninsula, and along the coastal belt to Grahamstown in the Eastern Cape, mainly among fynbos, on stony slopes and sandy flats.

Harveya species are native to Africa, Madagascar, and Yemen. This species is holoparasitic- that is, entirely non-photosynthetic, with a preference for members of the Campanulaceae such as Roella and Wahlenbergia. The disabling of the photosynthesis gene has happened independently several times in Scrophulariales.
