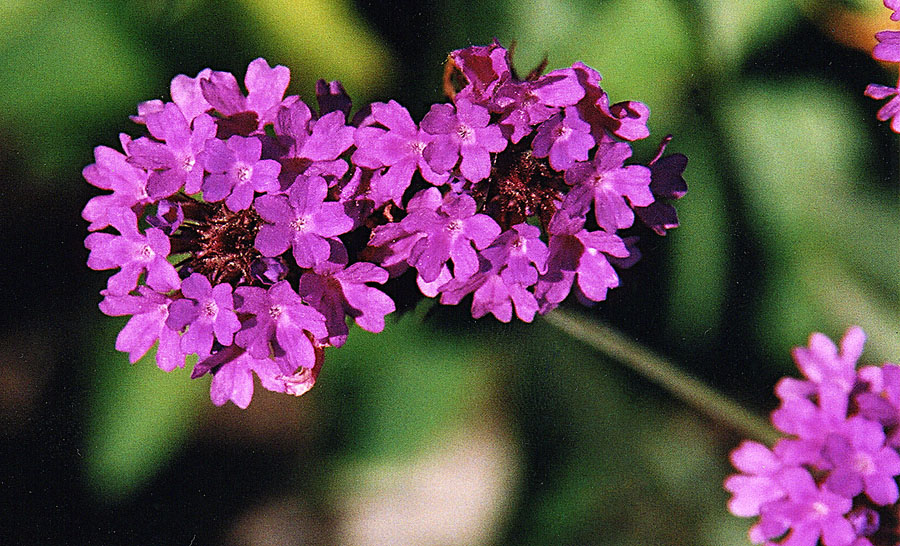

Scientific classification
- Kingdom: Plantae
- Clade: Tracheophytes
- Clade: Angiosperms
- Clade: Eudicots
- Clade: Asterids
- Order: Lamiales
- Family: Verbenaceae
- Genus: Verbena
- Species: V. rigida

Binomial name
- Verbena rigida Spreng.

Synonyms
- Verbena venosa Gillies & Hook.; Verbena scaberrima Cham.

= Verbena rigida =

Species of flowering plant

Verbena rigida, known as slender vervain or tuberous vervain, is a flowering herbaceous perennial plant in the family Verbenaceae. It is native to Brazil and Argentina, and is not fully hardy in temperate climates, where consequently it is grown from seed as an annual.

Growing to 60 centimetres (24 in), it has a spreading habit, with stalkless toothed leaves and clusters of bright purple or magenta, scented flowers, held on branched stalks, in summer. Numerous cultivars have been selected for garden use.

The species has gained the Royal Horticultural Society's Award of Garden Merit.
