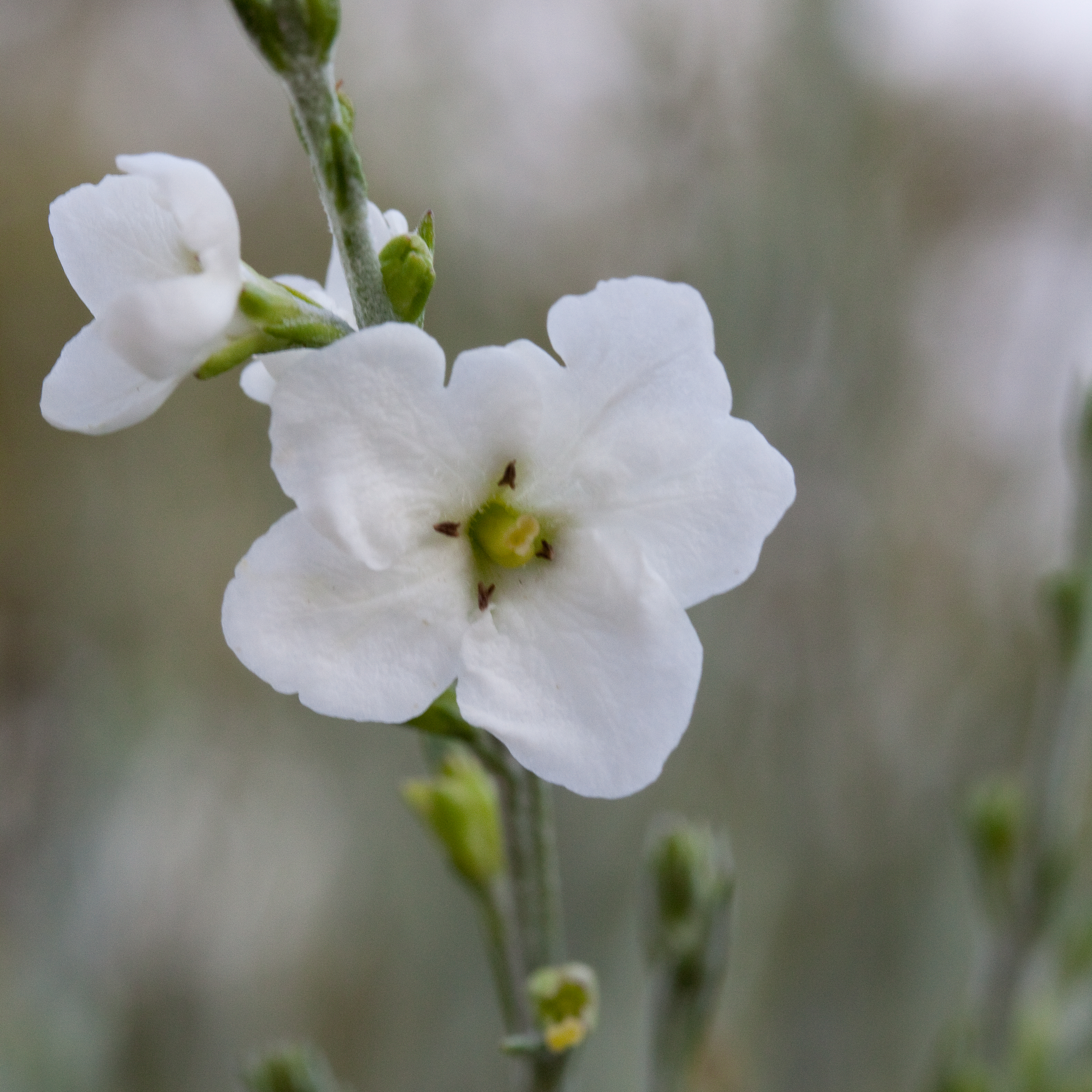

Scientific classification
- Kingdom: Plantae
- Clade: Embryophytes
- Clade: Tracheophytes
- Clade: Spermatophytes
- Clade: Angiosperms
- Clade: Eudicots
- Clade: Asterids
- Order: Lamiales
- Family: Scrophulariaceae
- Genus: Gomphostigma; Turcz.

= Gomphostigma =

Genus of plants

Gomphostigma is a genus of flowering plants belonging to the family Scrophulariaceae.

Its native range is Southern Congo to Southern Africa.

Species:

- Gomphostigma incomptum (L.f.) N.E.Br.
- Gomphostigma virgatum (L.f.) Baill.
