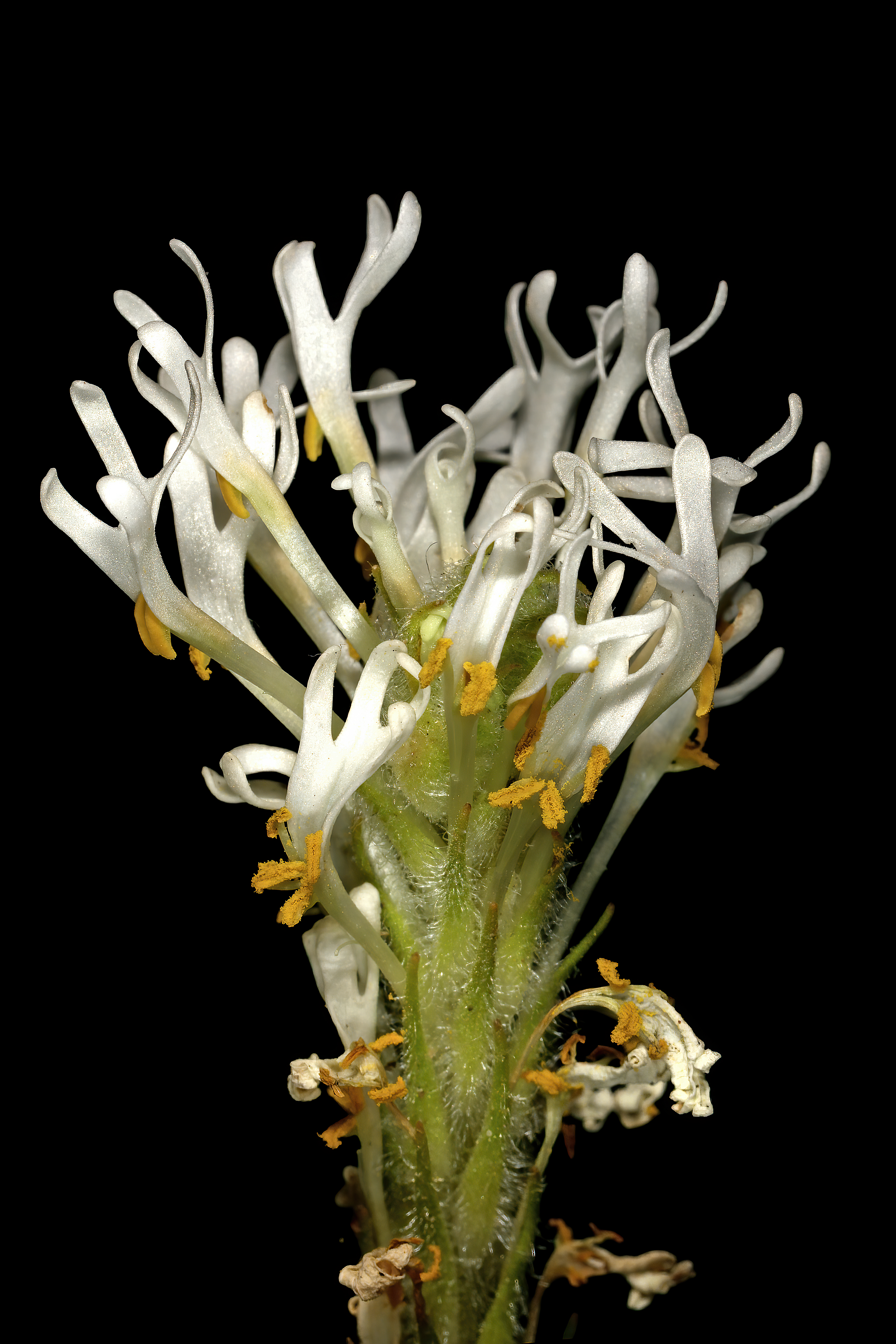
- Dischisma spicatum

Scientific classification
- Kingdom: Plantae
- Clade: Tracheophytes
- Clade: Angiosperms
- Clade: Eudicots
- Clade: Asterids
- Order: Lamiales
- Family: Scrophulariaceae
- Genus: Dischisma; Choisy

= Dischisma =

Genus of plants

Dischisma is a genus of flowering plants belonging to the family Scrophulariaceae.

Its native range is in Africa, from Namibia to South Africa.

Species:

- Dischisma arenarium E.Mey.
- Dischisma capitatum (Thunb.) Choisy
- Dischisma ciliatum (Berger) Choisy
- Dischisma clandestinum E.Mey.
- Dischisma crassum Rolfe
- Dischisma fruticosum (L.f.) Rolfe
- Dischisma leptostachyum E.Mey.
- Dischisma spicatum (Thunb.) Choisy
- Dischisma squarrosum Schltr.
- Dischisma struthioloides Killick
- Dischisma tomentosum Schltr.
