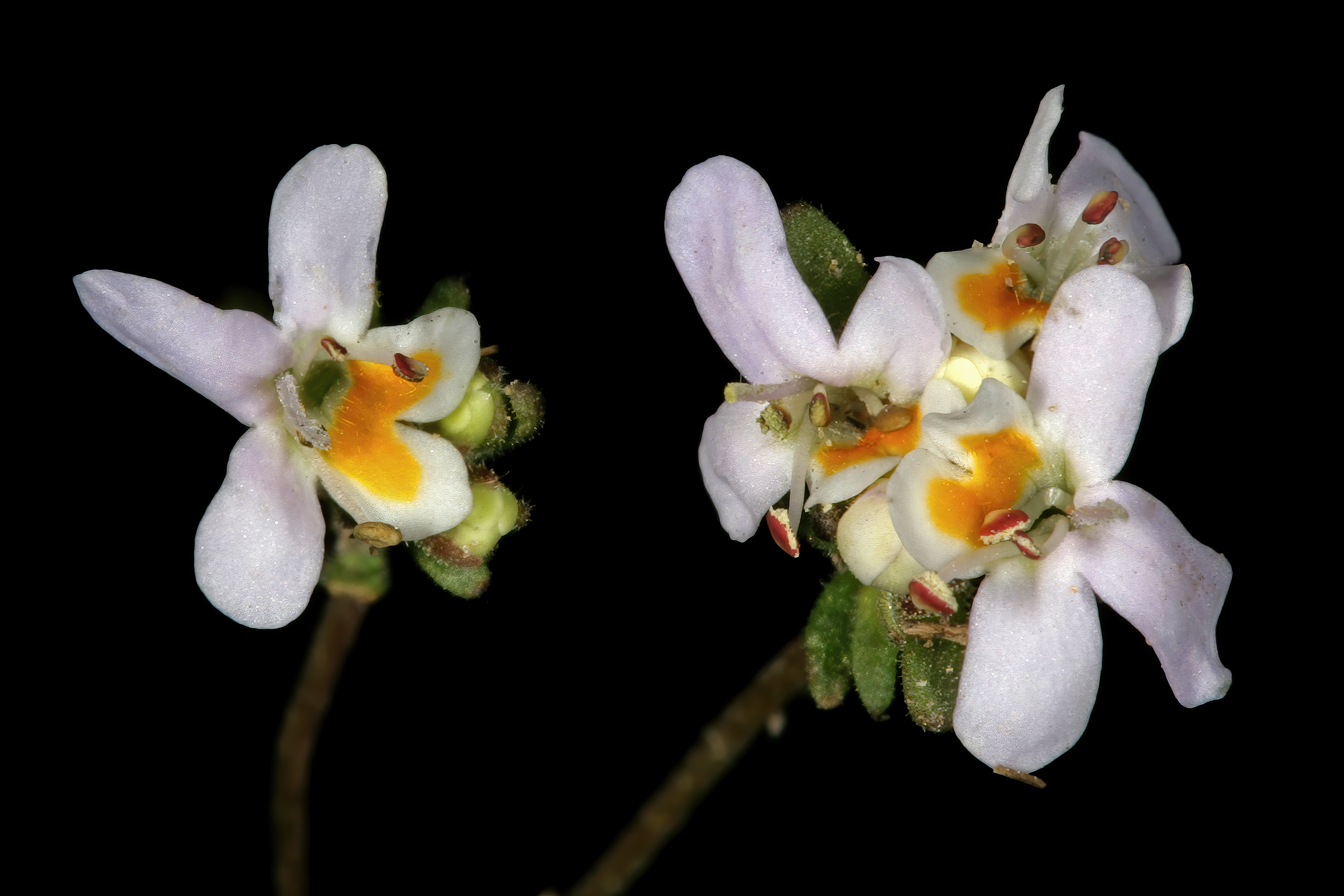
- Melanospermum foliosum

Scientific classification
- Kingdom: Plantae
- Clade: Embryophytes
- Clade: Tracheophytes
- Clade: Spermatophytes
- Clade: Angiosperms
- Clade: Eudicots
- Clade: Asterids
- Order: Lamiales
- Family: Scrophulariaceae
- Genus: Melanospermum; Hilliard

= Melanospermum =

Genus of plants

Melanospermum is a genus of flowering plants in the family Scrophulariaceae, native to a range extending from Zimbabwe throughout Southern Africa.

== Species ==
The genus comprises the following species:

- Melanospermum foliosum (Benth.) Hilliard
- Melanospermum italae Hilliard
- Melanospermum rudolfii Hilliard
- Melanospermum rupestre (Hiern) Hilliard
- Melanospermum swazicum Hilliard
- Melanospermum transvaalense (Hiern) Hilliard
