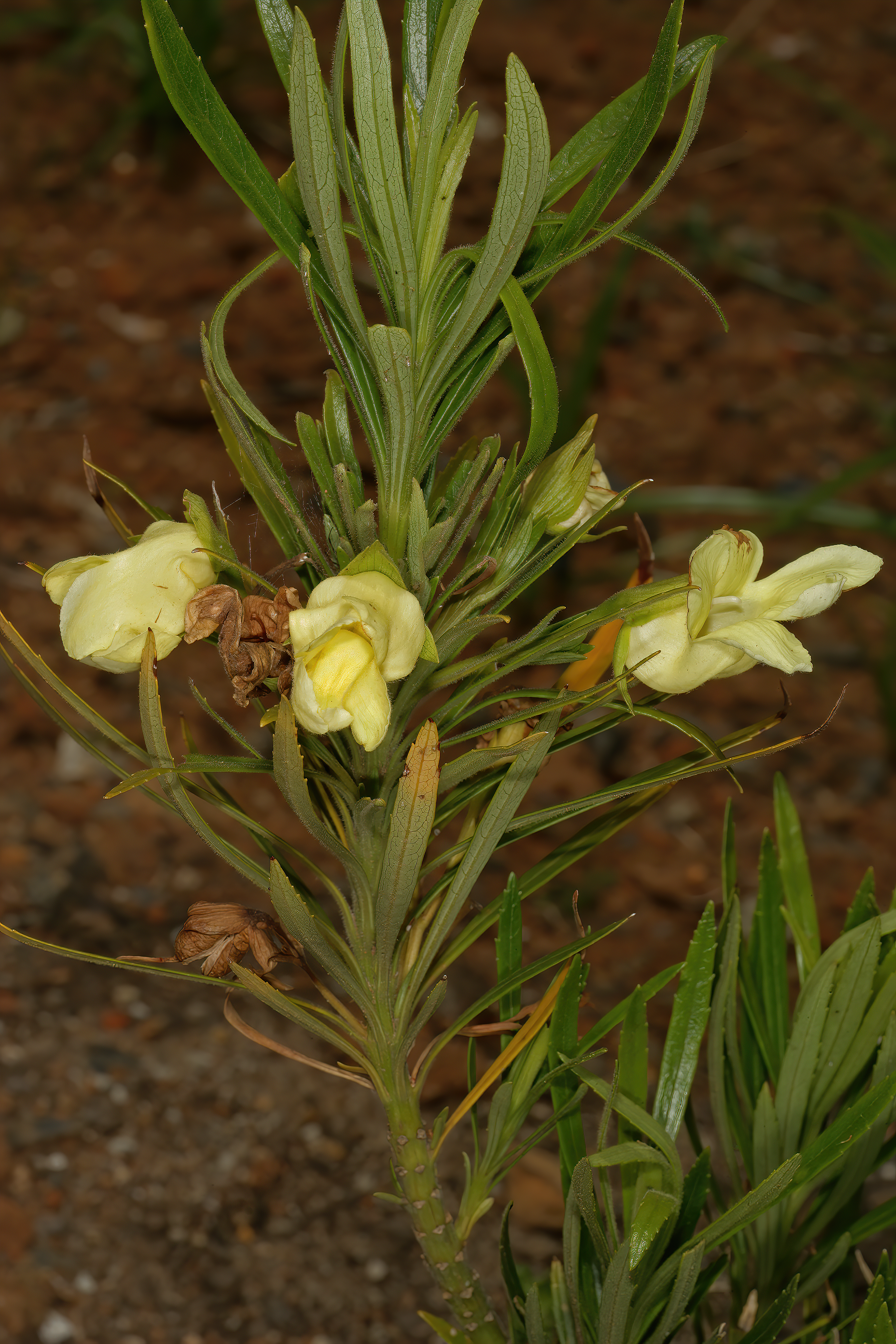
- Ixianthes retzioides, flower

Scientific classification
- Kingdom: Plantae
- Clade: Tracheophytes
- Clade: Angiosperms
- Clade: Eudicots
- Clade: Asterids
- Order: Lamiales
- Family: Stilbaceae
- Genus: Ixianthes; Benth.
- Species: I. retzioides

Binomial name
- Ixianthes retzioides Benth.

= Ixianthes =

Genus of flowering plants

Ixianthes is a genus of flowering plants in the family Stilbaceae described as a genus in 1836.

There is only one known species, Ixianthes retzioides, native to Western Cape Province in South Africa.
