= Gosela =

Scientific classification
- Kingdom: Plantae
- Clade: Tracheophytes
- Clade: Angiosperms
- Clade: Eudicots
- Clade: Asterids
- Order: Lamiales
- Family: Scrophulariaceae
- Genus: Gosela; Choisy

Genus of plants

Gosela is a genus of flowering plants belonging to the family Scrophulariaceae.

Its native range is South African Republic.

Species:

- Gosela eckloniana Choisy
