= Tetraselago =

Scientific classification
- Kingdom: Plantae
- Clade: Tracheophytes
- Clade: Angiosperms
- Clade: Eudicots
- Clade: Asterids
- Order: Lamiales
- Family: Scrophulariaceae
- Genus: Tetraselago; Junell

Genus of flowering plants

Tetraselago. is a genus of flowering plants belonging to the family Scrophulariaceae.

Its native range is KwaZulu-Natal, Northern Provinces and Eswatini.

Species:

- Tetraselago longituba (Rolfe) Hilliard & B.L.Burtt
- Tetraselago natalensis (Rolfe) Junell
- Tetraselago nelsonii (Rolfe) Hilliard & B.L.Burtt
- Tetraselago wilmsii (Rolfe) Hilliard & B.L.Burtt
