= Chamaecrypta =

Scientific classification
- Kingdom: Plantae
- Clade: Tracheophytes
- Clade: Angiosperms
- Clade: Eudicots
- Clade: Asterids
- Order: Lamiales
- Family: Scrophulariaceae
- Genus: Chamaecrypta; Schltr. & Diels

Genus of flowering plants

Chamaecrypta is a genus of flowering plants belonging to the family Scrophulariaceae.

Its native range is Southern Africa.

Species:

- Chamaecrypta diasciifolia Schltr. & Diels
