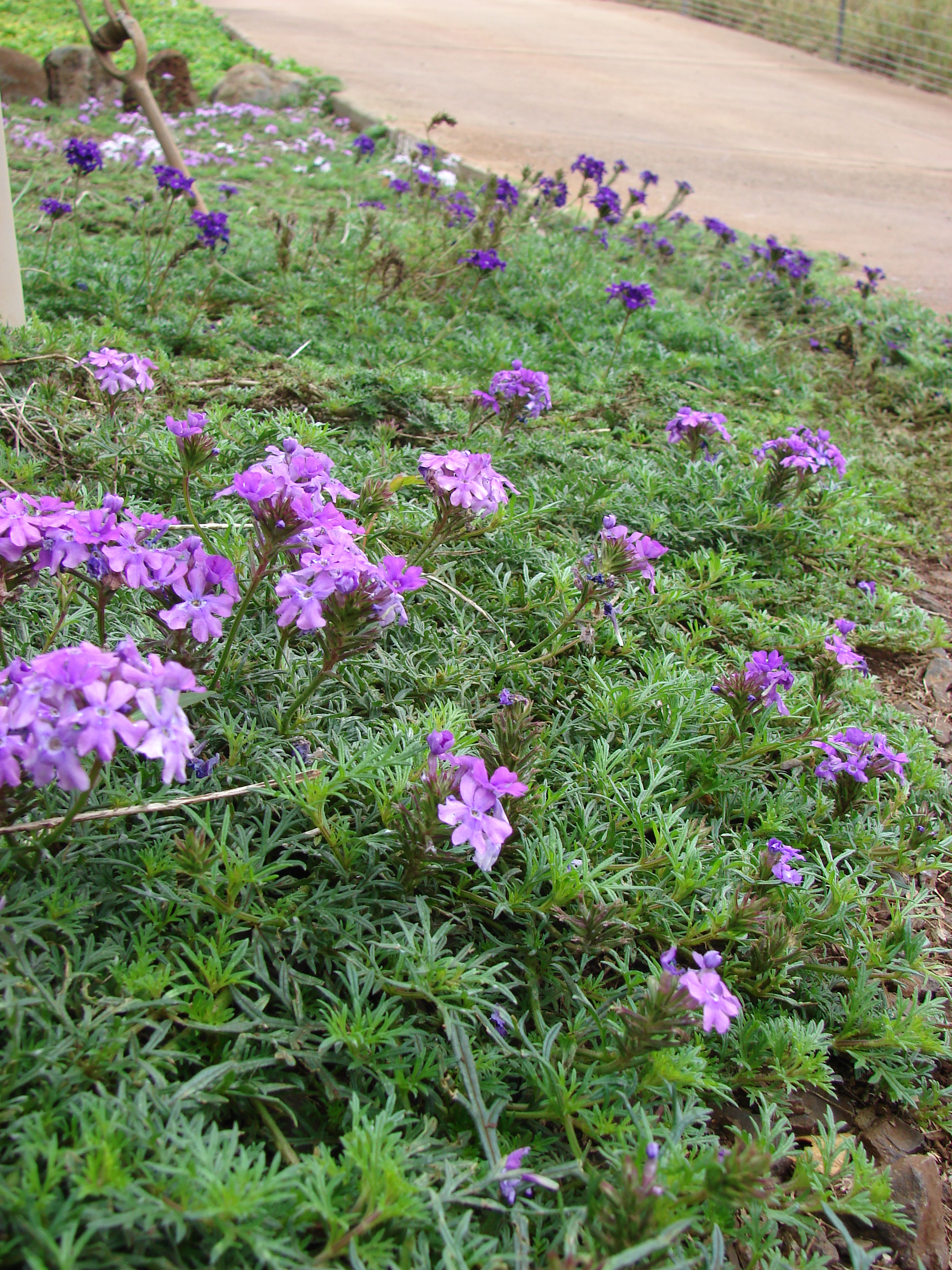
- In Hawaii, some with dark and medium purple flowers, and white-flowered individuals in the background
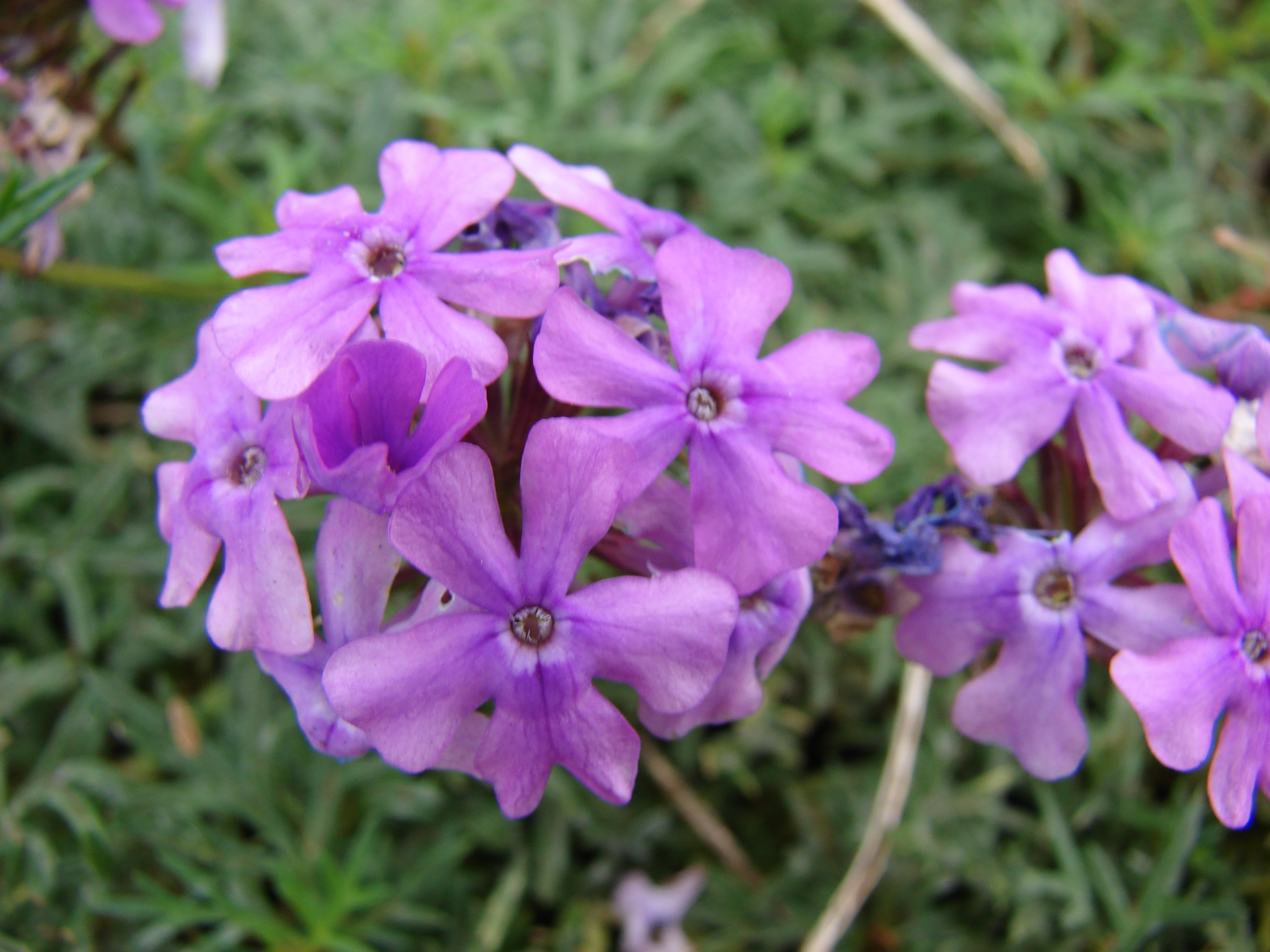
- Close-up of flowers

Scientific classification
- Kingdom: Plantae
- Clade: Tracheophytes
- Clade: Angiosperms
- Clade: Eudicots
- Clade: Asterids
- Order: Lamiales
- Family: Verbenaceae
- Genus: Glandularia
- Species: G. aristigera

Binomial name
- Glandularia aristigera (S.Moore) Tronc.

Synonyms
- List: Verbena aristigera (S.Moore); Glandularia cochabambensis (Moldenke) Liesner; Glandularia tenuisecta (Briq.) Small; Verbena cochabambensis Moldenke; Verbena tenuisecta Briq.; Verbena tenuisecta var. alba Moldenke; Verbena tenuisecta f. rubella Moldenke

= Glandularia aristigera =

Species of plant in the verbena family

Glandularia aristigera (syns. Verbena aristigera and Verbena tenuisecta), variously called the moss verbena, desert verbena, fine leafed verbena, wild verbena, tuber vervain, South American mock vervain, Mayne's curse and Mayne's pest, is a species of flowering plant in the family Verbenaceae. It is native to Bolivia, southern Brazil, northern Argentina, Paraguay and Uruguay. It has been widely introduced to the rest of the world's drier tropics and subtropics, including California, Guatemala, Honduras, Nicaragua, Venezuela, Greece, Nigeria, eastern and southern Africa, India, and all of Australia except Tasmania.

== Invasiveness ==
=== Australia ===
Glandularia aristigera is considered an environmental weed in parts of Australia particularly in coastal and subcoastal areas. It is an ornamental garden escapee which invades agricultural areas and native vegetation. It is still cultivated and sold in the Northern Territory despite being regarded as one of the top 10 most invasive garden plants in arid areas of the territory.
