= Chenopodiopsis =

Scientific classification
- Kingdom: Plantae
- Clade: Tracheophytes
- Clade: Angiosperms
- Clade: Eudicots
- Clade: Asterids
- Order: Lamiales
- Family: Scrophulariaceae
- Genus: Chenopodiopsis; Hilliard & B.L.Burtt

Genus of flowering plants

Chenopodiopsis is a genus of flowering plants belonging to the family Scrophulariaceae.

Its native range is South African Republic.

Species:

- Chenopodiopsis chenopodioides (Diels) Hilliard
- Chenopodiopsis hirta (L.f.) Hilliard
- Chenopodiopsis retrorsa Hilliard
