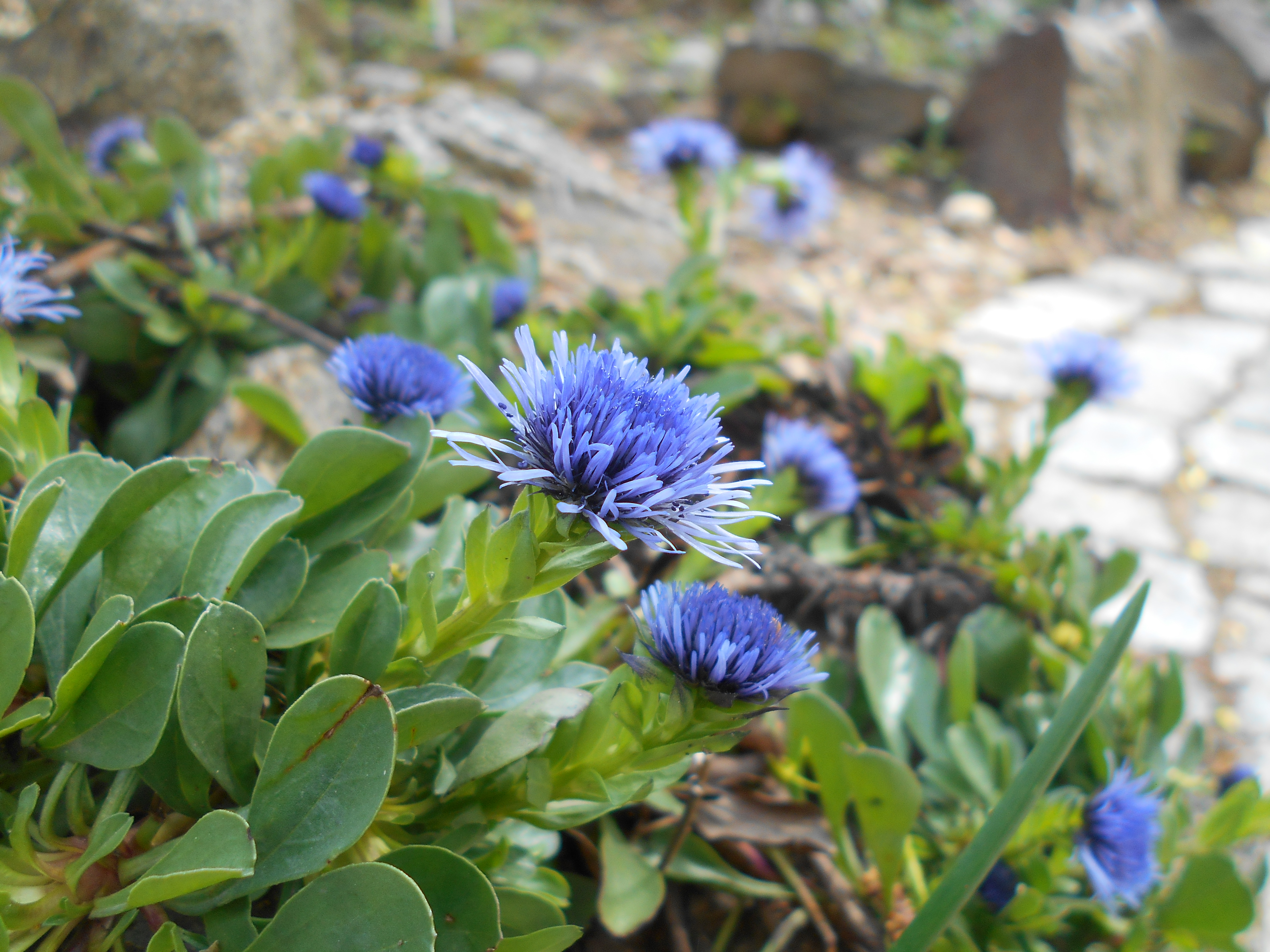

Scientific classification
- Kingdom: Plantae
- Clade: Embryophytes
- Clade: Tracheophytes
- Clade: Spermatophytes
- Clade: Angiosperms
- Clade: Eudicots
- Clade: Asterids
- Order: Lamiales
- Family: Scrophulariaceae
- Genus: Globulariopsis; Compton

= Globulariopsis =

Genus of plants

Globulariopsis is a genus of flowering plants belonging to the family Scrophulariaceae.

Its native range is South African Republic.

Species:

- Globulariopsis adpressa (Choisy) Hilliard
- Globulariopsis montana Hilliard
- Globulariopsis obtusiloba Hilliard
- Globulariopsis pumila Hilliard
- Globulariopsis stricta (P.J.Bergius) Hilliard
- Globulariopsis tephrodes (E.Mey.) Hilliard
- Globulariopsis wittebergensis Compton
