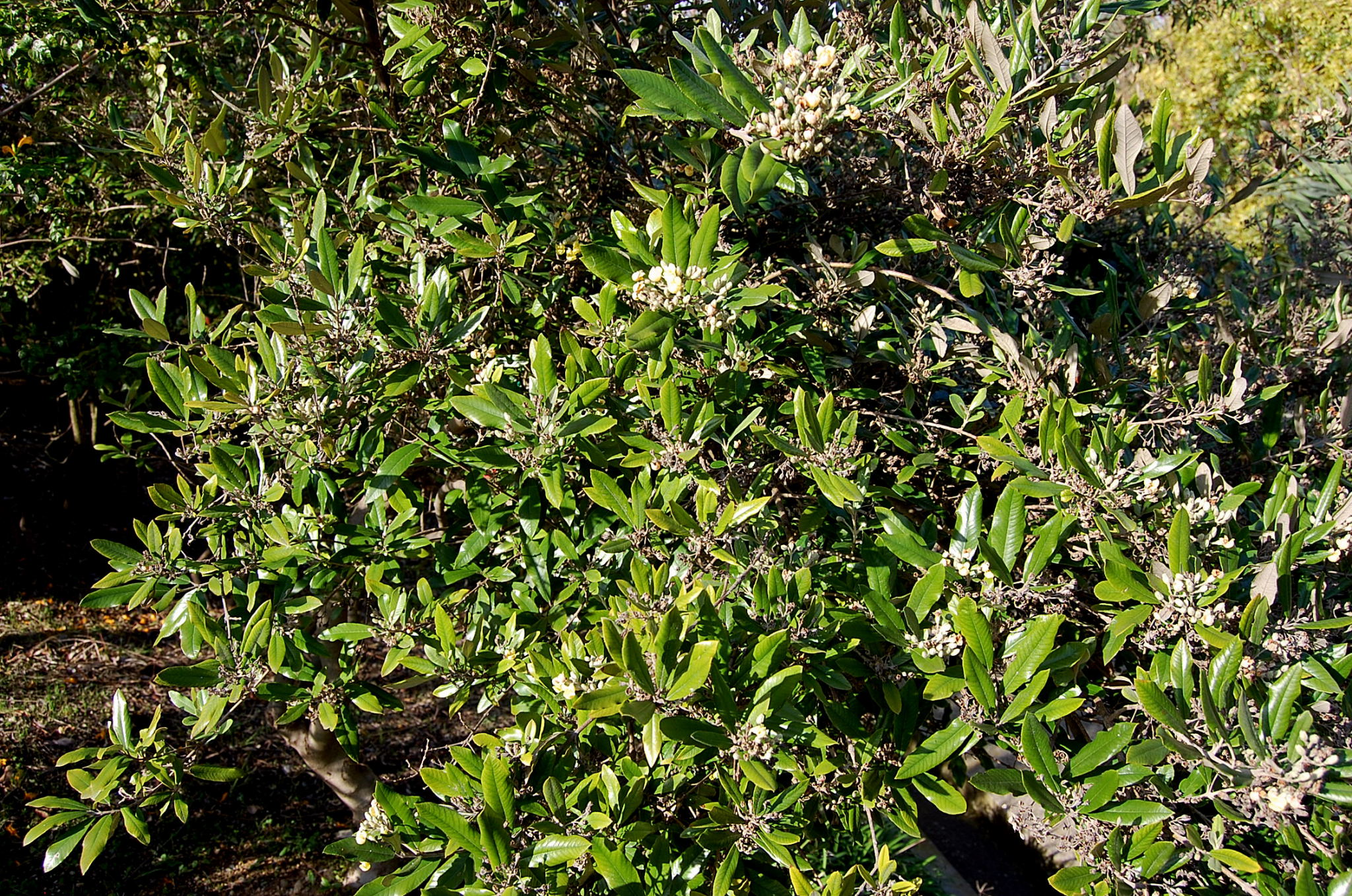
- Anastrabe integerrima

Scientific classification
- Kingdom: Plantae
- Clade: Tracheophytes
- Clade: Angiosperms
- Clade: Eudicots
- Clade: Asterids
- Order: Lamiales
- Family: Stilbaceae
- Genus: Anastrabe; E.Mey. ex Benth.
- Species: A. integerrima

Binomial name
- Anastrabe integerrima E.Mey. ex Benth.

Synonyms
- Anastrabe serrulata E.Mey. ex Benth.

= Anastrabe =

Genus of flowering plants

Anastrabe is a genus of flowering plants in the family Stilbaceae described as a genus in 1836.

There is only one known species, Anastrabe integerrima, native to Kwazulu-Natal Province in South Africa.
