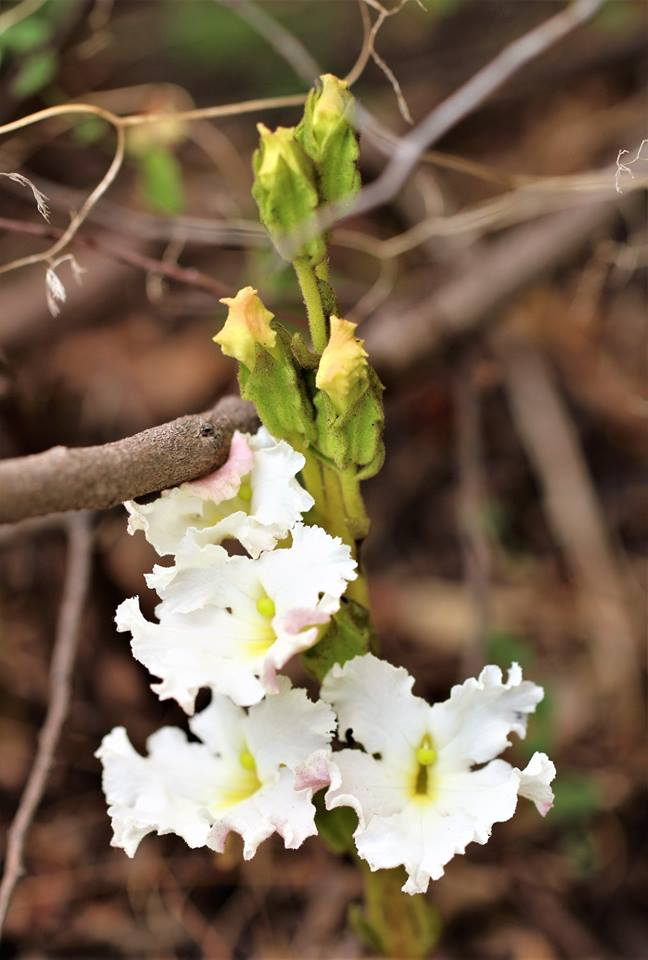
- Harveya capensis seen in South Africa, in 2019

Scientific classification
- Kingdom: Plantae
- Clade: Tracheophytes
- Clade: Angiosperms
- Clade: Eudicots
- Clade: Asterids
- Order: Lamiales
- Family: Orobanchaceae
- Tribe: Buchnereae
- Genus: Harveya; Hook. (1837)

Species
- 29; see text

Synonyms
- Aulaya Harv. (1838); Parastriga Mildbr. (1930)

= Harveya (plant) =

Genus of flowering plants in the broomrape family

Harveya is a genus of parasitic plants in the family Orobanchaceae. The approximately 29 species included are native to Africa from Eritrea to South Africa, Madagascar and the Mascarene Islands, the Arabian Peninsula, and Turkmenistan in Central Asia. In South Africa they are commonly known as 'inkblom', because early settlers used the flowers to make ink, and this is the source of the English common-names for the genus of ink flower or ink plant.

The genus was named after William Henry Harvey, thus achieving one of his childhood ambitions. Discussing his vocational prospects as a youth, Harvey wrote that he was "neither fit to be a doctor nor a lawyer, lacking courage for the one, and face for the other, and application for both.... All I have a taste for is natural history, and that might possibly lead in days to come to a genus called Harveya, and the letters F.L.S. after my name, and with that I shall be content."

== Species ==
29 species are accepted.

- Harveya alba Hepper
- Harveya alectroides (Mildbr.) Eb.Fisch., Schäferh. & Kai Müll.
- Harveya andongensis Hiern
- Harveya bodkinii Hiern
- Harveya bolusii Kuntze
- Harveya buchwaldii Engl.
- Harveya capensis (Burm.f.) Hook. – South Africa
- Harveya comorensis Vatke – Comoros
- Harveya helenae Buscal. & Muschl.
- Harveya huillensis Hiern
- Harveya huttonii Hiern – South Africa
- Harveya hyobanchoides Schltr. ex Hiern
- Harveya kenyensis Hepper
- Harveya kiangombensis Ngugi, Kirika & Mwachala
- Harveya liebuschiana Engl. ex Skan
- Harveya obtusifolia (Benth.) Vatke – Madagascar and Yemen
- Harveya pauciflora (Benth.) Hiern – South Africa
- Harveya pumila Schltr. – South Africa
- Harveya purpurea Harv. ex Hook. – South Africa
- Harveya roseoalba J.C.Manning & Goldblatt
- Harveya scarlatina (Benth.) Hook. ex B.D.Jacks. – South Africa
- Harveya speciosa Bernh. – South Africa
- Harveya squamosa Steud. – South Africa
- Harveya stenosiphon Hiern – South Africa
- Harveya tanzanica Hepper
- Harveya thonneri De Wild. & T.Durand
- Harveya versicolor Engl.
- Harveya vestita Hiern
