= Lists of cultivars =

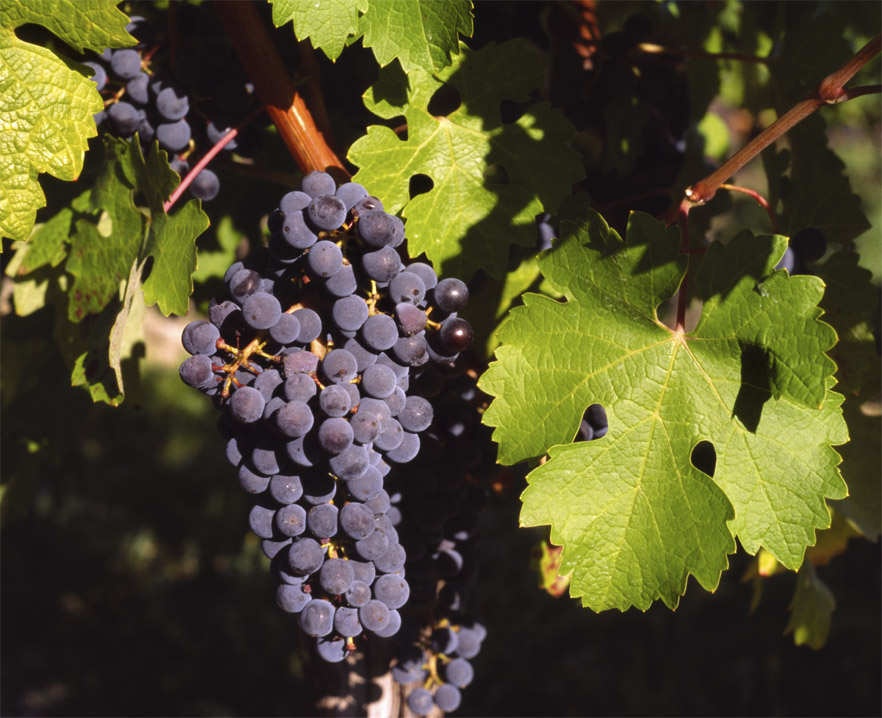
Cabernet Sauvignon grapes in Gaillac, France

The lists of cultivars in the table below are indices of plant cultivars, varieties, and strains. A cultivar is a plant that is selected for desirable characteristics that can be maintained by propagation.

The plants listed may be ornamental, medicinal, and/or edible. Several of them bear edible fruit. Plants are selectively bred for phenotypic traits (such as flower colour) and other hereditary traits. When developing a new variety, a plant breeder might value such characteristics as appearance, disease resistance, and hardiness. In the cultivation of edible fruit and vegetables, nutritional value, shelf life, and crop yield are also among the potential considerations.

Some of the lists use the word variety instead of cultivar. In most of these lists, variety refers to a cultivar that is recognised by the International Union for the Protection of New Varieties of Plants (UPOV). A cultivar must meet certain criteria in order to be recognised by UPOV as a named variety.

In a few lists, variety means something else: a taxonomic rank below that of species (a kind of subspecies). If the species' binomial name is followed by the word var. and another name, that is a botanical variety, not a cultivar.

== List ==
Common name	Taxon	Woody / Herbaceous	List of cultivars
Apple	Malus domestica	Woody	Apple cultivars
Banana / Plaintain	Musa	Herbaceous	Banana cultivars
Cannabis	Cannabis	Herbaceous	Cannabis strains
Cherimoya	Annona cherimola	Woody	Cherimoya cultivars
Citrus	Citrus	Woody	Citrus hybrids and cultivars
Coffee	Coffea	Woody	Coffee varieties
Sweet corn	Zea mays convar. saccharata var. rugosa	Herbaceous	Sweetcorn varieties
Basil	Ocimum	Herbaceous	Basil cultivars
Bottlebrush	Callistemon	Woody	Callistemon cultivars
Canna lily	Canna	Herbaceous	Canna cultivars
Chili pepper	Capsicum	Herbaceous	Capsicum cultivars
Cucumber	Cucumis sativus	Herbaceous	Cucumber varieties
Date	Phoenix dactylifera	Woody	Date cultivars
Elm	Ulmus	Woody	Elm cultivars, hybrids and hybrid cultivars
Gazania	Gazania	Herbaceous	Gazania cultivars
Grape	Vitis	Woody	Grape varieties
Grevillea	Grevillea	Woody	Grevillea cultivars
Hops	Humulus lupulus	Herbaceous	Hop varieties
Maize	Zea mays subsp. mays	Herbaceous	Italian traditional maize varieties
Mango	Mangifera	Woody	Mango cultivars
Nemesia	Nemesia	Herbaceous	Nemesia cultivars
Olive	Olea europaea	Woody	Olive cultivars
Onion	Allium cepa	Herbaceous	Onion cultivars
Pear	Pyrus	Woody	Pear cultivars
Tropical pitcher plant	Nepenthes	Herbaceous	Nepenthes cultivars
Pumpkin	Cucurbita pepo	Herbaceous	Pumpkin varieties grown in the United States
Asian rice	Oryza sativa	Herbaceous	Rice varieties
Rose	Rosa	Woody	All-America Rose Selections; Award of Garden Merit roses; Rose cultivars named after people
Strawberry	Fragaria ananassa	Herbaceous	Strawberry cultivars
Sweet potato	Ipomoea batatas	Herbaceous	Sweet potato cultivars
Tomato	Solanum lycopersicum	Herbaceous	Tomato cultivars
Venus flytrap	Dionaea muscipula	Herbaceous	Venus flytrap cultivars

== See also ==
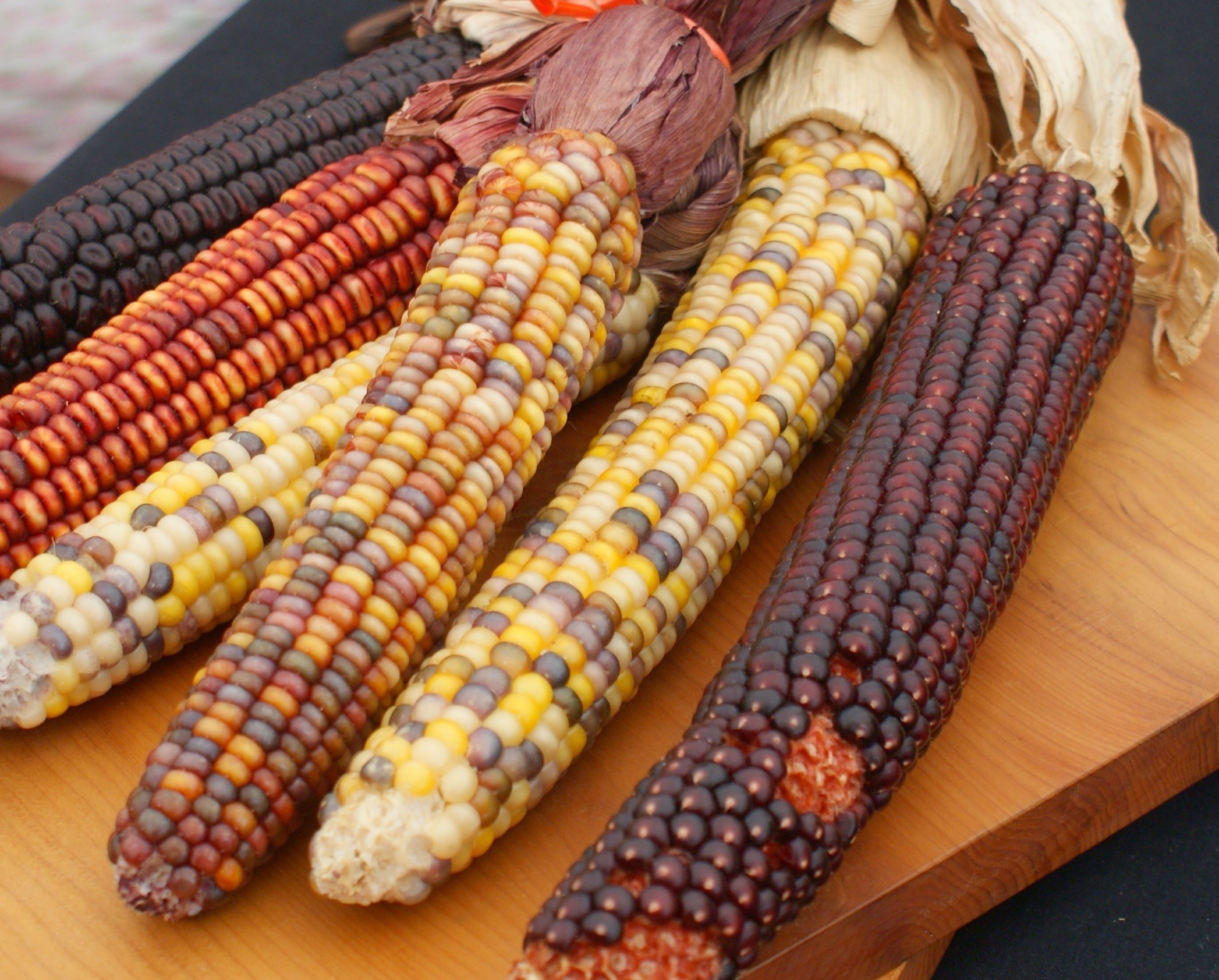
Variegated ears of maize

- Cultivated plant taxonomy
- Genetic variation
- Horticulture
- Introduction to genetics
- Landrace
