= N. floribunda =

N. floribunda may refer to:

- Neea floribunda, a New World plant
- Nemesia floribunda, a plant native to South Africa
- Nuxia floribunda, a tree native to Africa
- Nuytsia floribunda, a hemiparasitic plant
