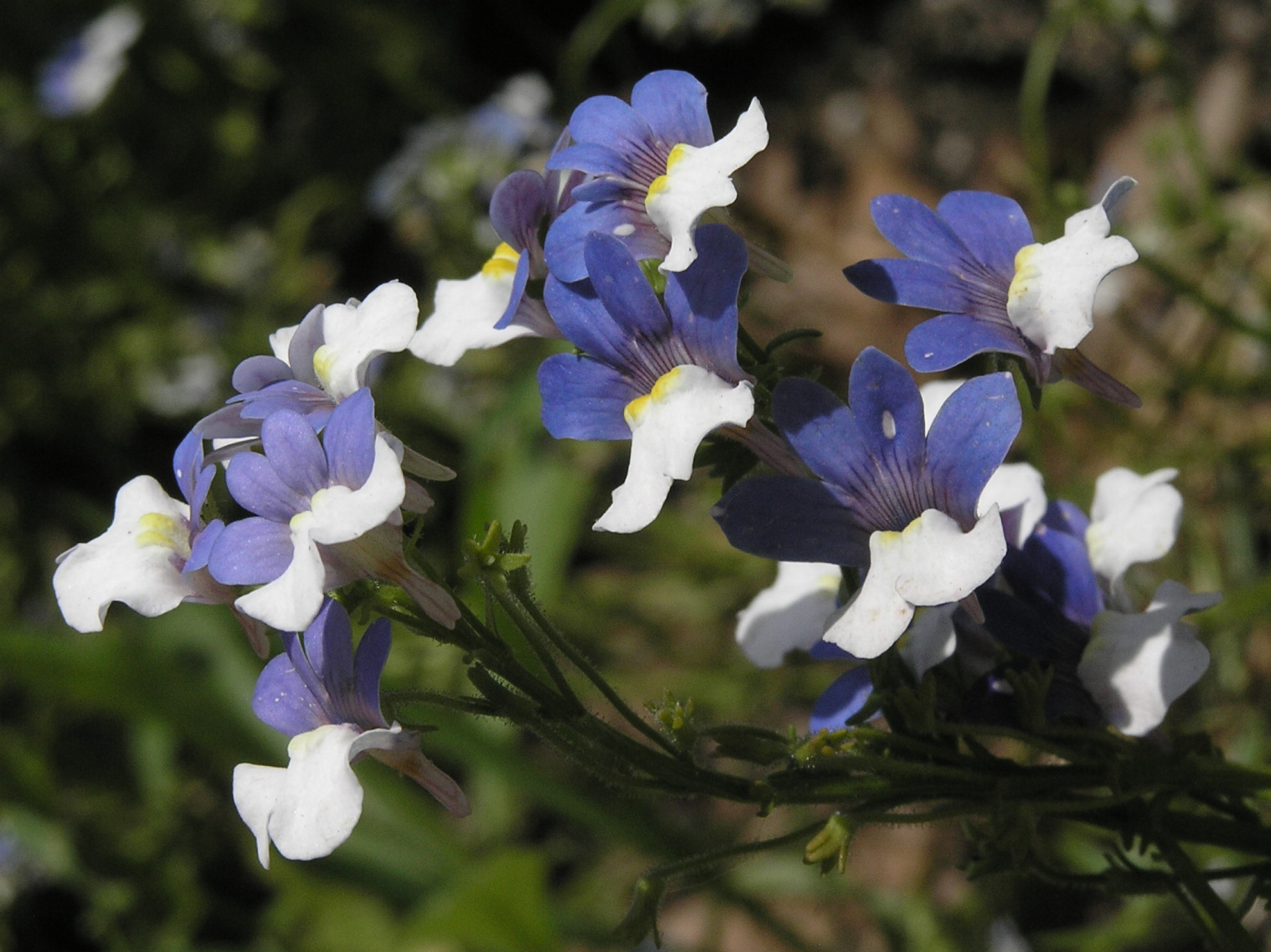

Scientific classification
- Kingdom: Plantae
- Clade: Embryophytes
- Clade: Tracheophytes
- Clade: Angiosperms
- Clade: Eudicots
- Clade: Asterids
- Order: Lamiales
- Family: Scrophulariaceae
- Genus: Nemesia
- Species: N. strumosa

Binomial name
- Nemesia strumosa Benth.

Synonyms
- Antirrhinum strumosum Banks ex Benth.

= Nemesia strumosa =

Species of flowering plant

Nemesia strumosa, Cape jewels or pouch nemesia, is a species of flowering plant in the family Scrophulariaceae, native to the southwestern Cape Provinces of South Africa. Suited for garden applications such as beds, borders, rock gardens and containers, its cultivars (many of which are actually hybrids with Nemesia versicolor) come in a wide variety of flower colours, including bicoloured. When grown as a cool‑weather annual it can be planted in USDA zones 2 through 10.

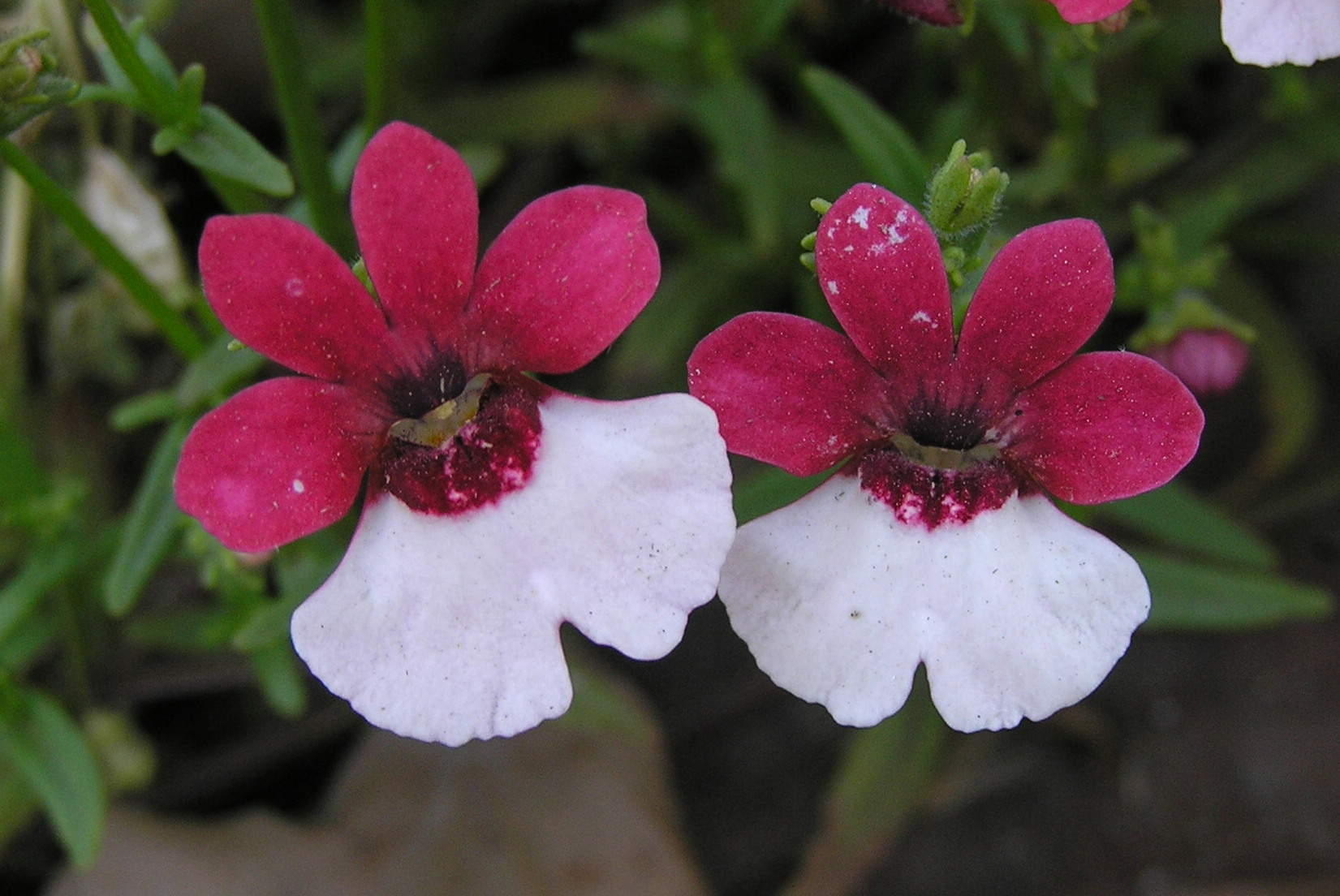
'Danish Flag' cultivar

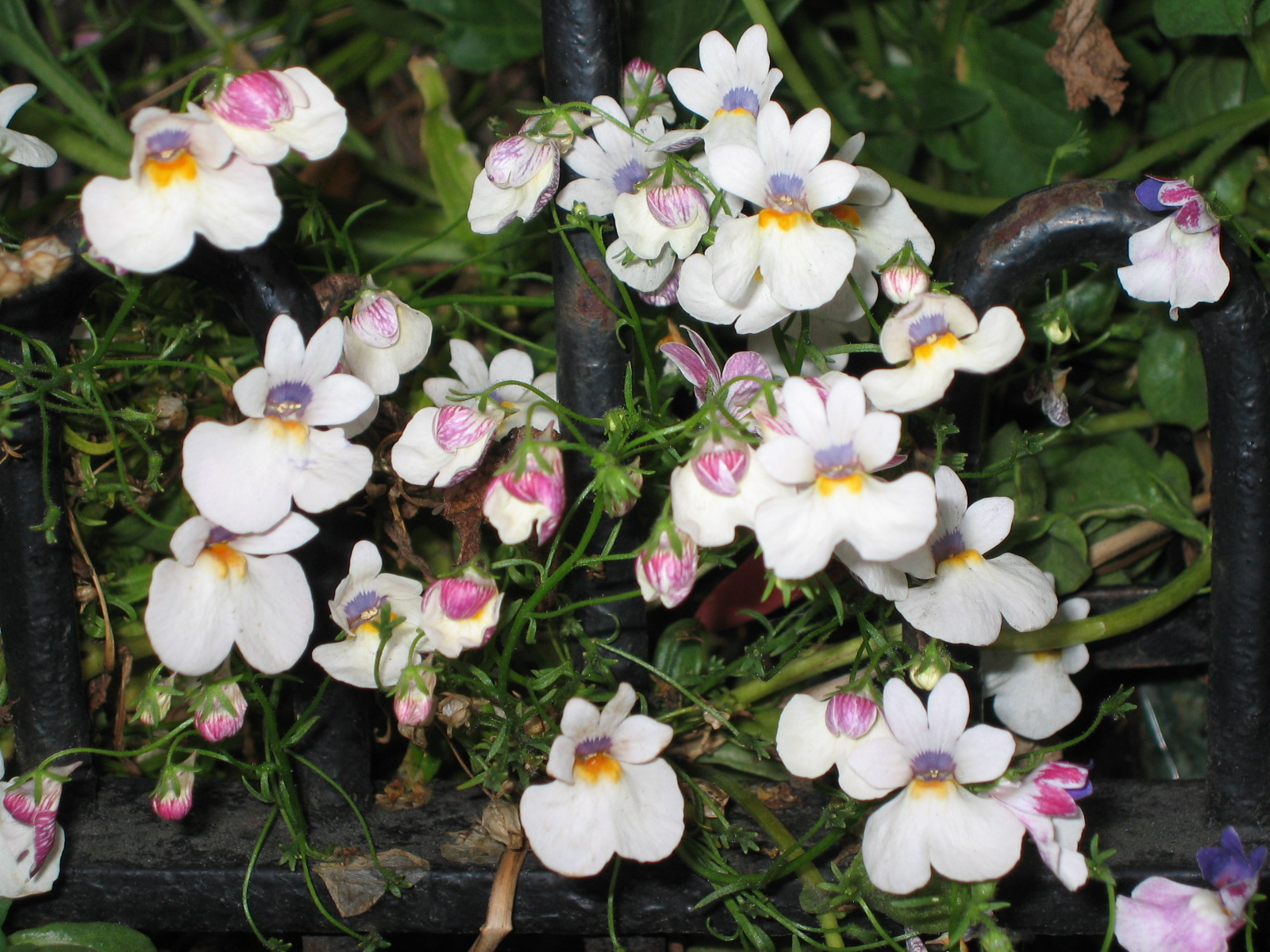
In Pitlochry, Scotland

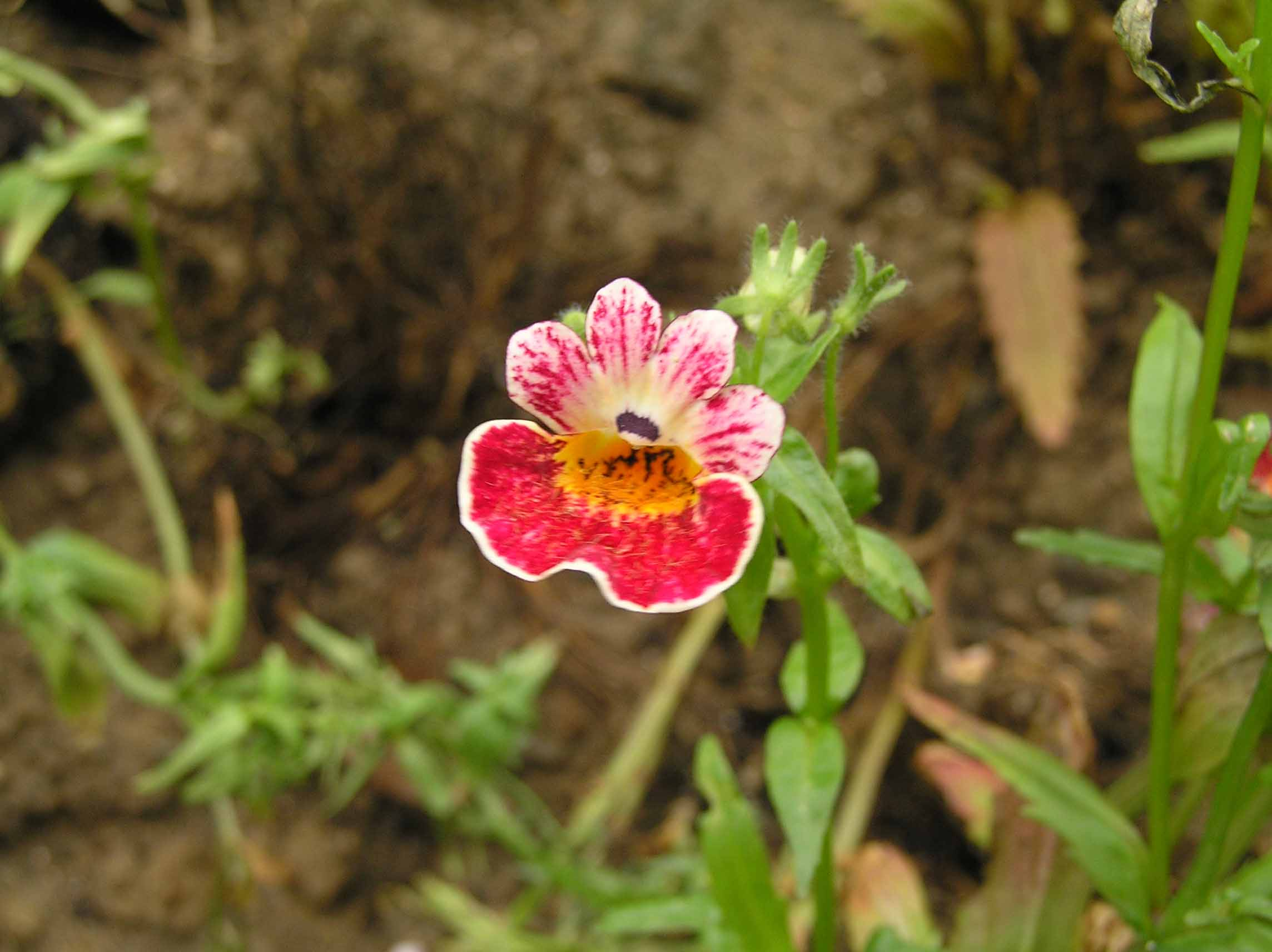
At the Taipei International Flora Exposition

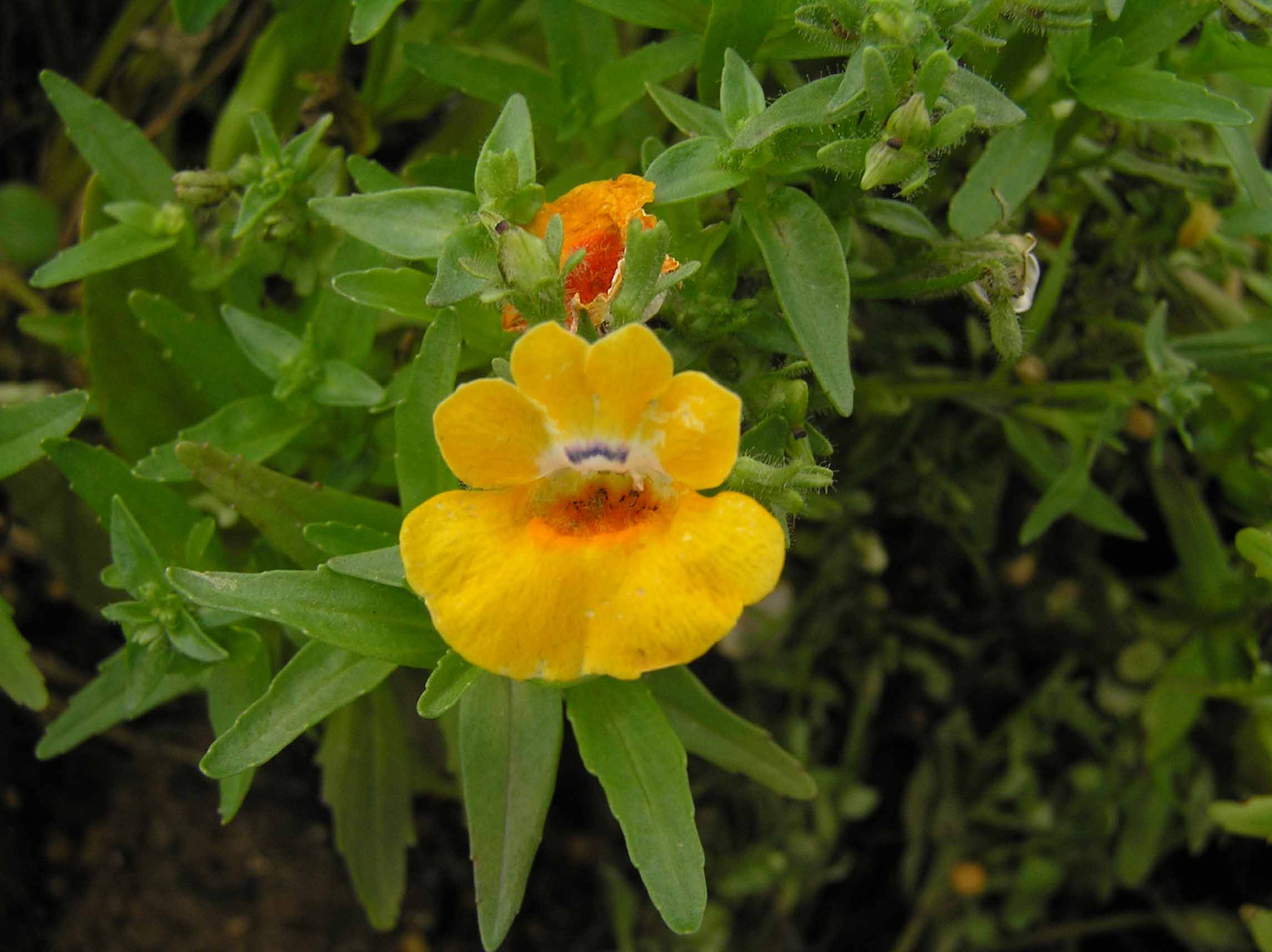
A yellow cultivar
