= List of rhubarb cultivars =

This is a list of all rhubarb cultivars. Varieties are not included on this list. The formal cultivar name of rhubarb cultivars will always be Rheum × hybridum 'Cultivar name' (for example: Rheum × hybridum 'Grandad's Favorite').

== Rhubarb cultivars ==
Common name	Description
'Alberger'	Has a flat globe shape and a short neck. The flesh is pale yellow and it has a reddish top. This cultivar matures early.
'Canada Red'	A very popular cultivar, first introduced in Canada. Its red stems are short and slender, but very tender.
'Cherry Red'	Has very large stalks and a tart taste. The color is a nice cherry red.
'Chipman's Canadian Red'	This cultivar is sweeter than most, and has dependable yields. It also has a bright red color that holds up, even after cooking.
'Crimson Red'	One of the most flavorful cultivars, this one has tall stalks and dependable yields.
'Glaskin's Perpetual'	Bright red; it can be harvested the first year after sowing.
'Grandad's Favorite'	High-yielding with thick, fairly sweet stems. Produces "first early" growth.
'Honeyred'	Has firm, crisp stalks with a mild, sweet flavor, and has a deep red color. This cultivar is susceptible to crown rot on heavy soils, but has very few seed stalks.
'Jersey'	Has good color and grows upright. The flavor is fine and sweet.
'Large Victoria'	Can be harvested in the first year.
'Macdonald'	Tender with a bright red color and has an excellent flavor.
'Reed's Early Superb'	Has medium to thick stems which are long, straight, tender, and succulent. Has a color gradient going from bright red to dark green.
'Ruby'	Has a rich ruby red color and numerous stalks. Moderately tart and is prone to having many seed stalks and red leaf disease.
'Stein's Champagne'	The whole length of its stems is a very bold, bright red color.
'Sunrise (Early Sunrise)'	Large and has very thick stalks. Very quick at producing seed stalks and has a nice red color.
'Timperley Early'	High-yielding, and produces "first early" growth. The stems are thick and have a color gradient going from deep red at the base to light green with red flecks.
'Valentine'	Has a brilliant red color and broad stalks. It is very flavorful and has no seed stalks. Good for freezing.
'Victoria'	A "late forcing" cultivar with big, green stalks.
'Waltham Yellow'	A cultivar that has green "shoulders".
