= List of cherimoya cultivars =

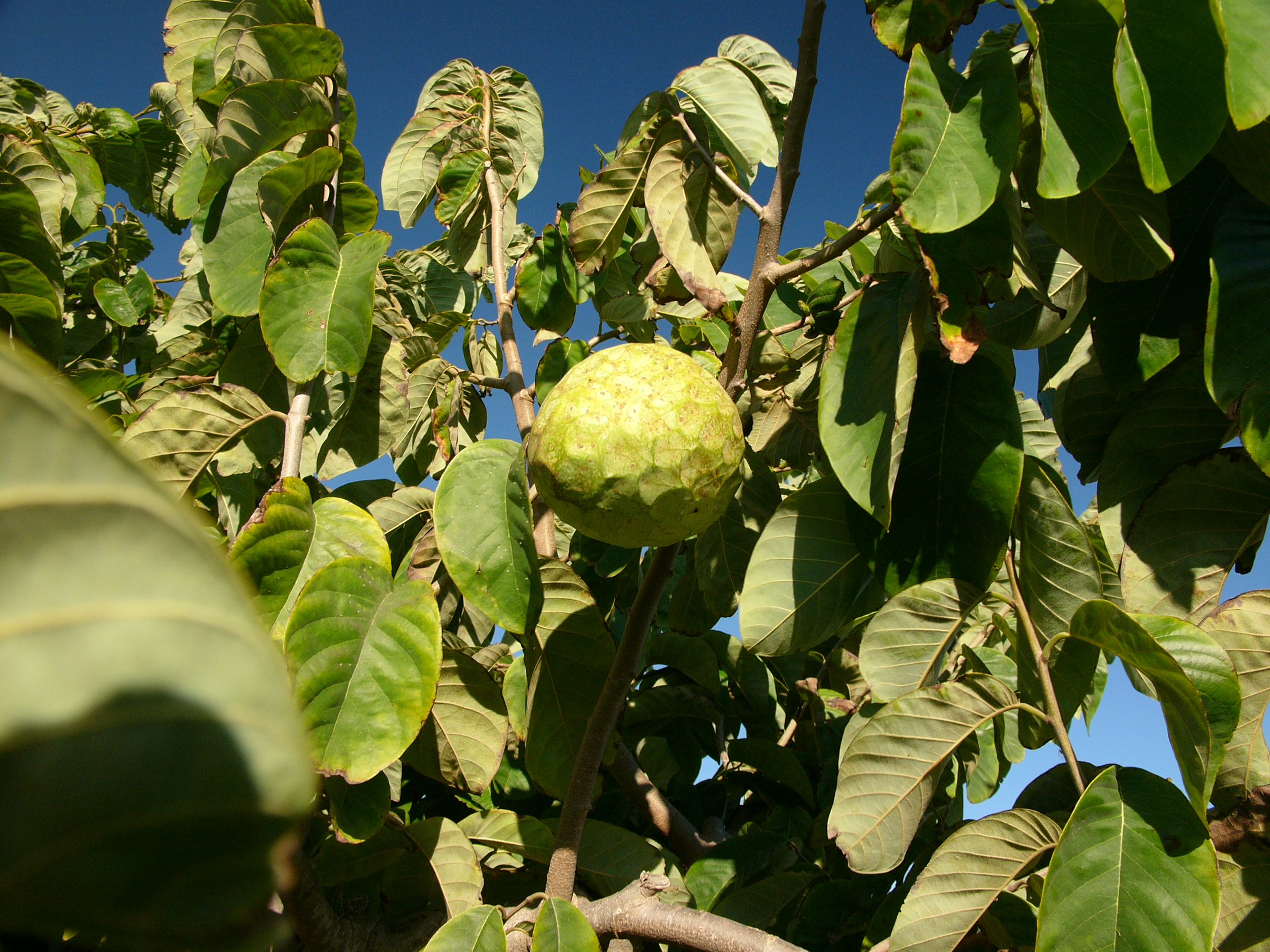
Detail of a fruiting Annona cherimola, with cherimoya at center

This list of cherimoya cultivars includes cultivars and varieties of cherimoya, the fruit of Annona cherimola.

Andrews
Amarilla
Asca
Baste
thick-skinned.
Bayott
(Bays x ott) Small to medium, smooth ovoid.
Bays
Tree broad, to 6 metres (20 ft), fruits round, medium size, light green, skin shows fingerprint like marks. Flavor good, almost lemony.
Bays Mt
Behl
very vigorous growing, self-pollinating cherimoya that is very juicy, complex flavours, excellent sweetness and acidity. It gives pierce, el bumpo, and NATA run for its money. No grit at all, smooth thin skin, has hint of vanilla, banana, raspberry, pine apple. Taste varies according to when picked. It is a seedling of unknown variety.
Big Sister
Sibling of Sabor. Fruit large, very smooth, good flavor. Often self-fruitful.
Blanca
Booth
Among hardiest of cherimoya, does well in most present growing areas. Tree 6–9 metres (20–30 ft) high. Fruit is conical, medium size, rather seedy, with flavor that suggests papaya.
Bronceada
Fruit of large size, conical shape and large number of bottles. Relatively thick skin, tan to yellow in maturity. Excellent organoleptic quality, with many seeds.
Bronceada Mt
Burtons Mt
Burton's Favorite
Campas
Canaria
Fruit with a rounded conical shape, medium size, smooth skin, canary yellow color, attractive. Pulp white something fibrous, very juicy and firm, aromatic, acidulated and of good flavor.
Capucha
Carter
Long-conical, but not shouldered; smooth or faintly fingerprinted; skin green to bronze; bears well. Late. Leaves wavy or twisted.
Chaffey
Tree rather open, fast growing. Result of UC-Riverside project to develop cold tolerant variety. Fruit small to medium, round, impressa type, with high, lemony flavor.
Chaffey Mt
Chavez
Fruits up to 1.5 kilograms (3.3 lb)
Chiuna 1
Chiuna 2
Chiuna 3
Concha Corriente
Concha Lisa
Rounded fruit with fingerprints areoles. Soft, creamy white pulp. Good conservation in cold. Early maturation.
Concha Pesada
Concha Picuda
Conde Concha
Copucha
Cortés II-31
Pulp with little seed, juicy and sweet. Low skin percentage and skin thickness is 1 mm and very resistant.
Cumbe
Variety(ies) Selected by Ministry of Agriculture in Peru (INDECOPI)for their promising commercial value (export) Protected as a branded regional growing area / indigenous select variety of Cherimoya.
Cuero Dechando
Dedo de Dama
Deliciosa
Long-conical, prominently papillate; skin thin, slightly downy; variable in flavor; only fair in quality; generally bears well but does not ship well; cold-resistant. Midseason.
Deliciosa Mt
Dream
Possible hybrid, a heat tolerant variety, vigorous grower, fruit is reported to be superior.
Durio Andes
Durio Colombia
Durio Ecuador
A selected seedling of El Bumpo, more cold hardy and adaptable for Coastal Central California. Fruit has similar characteristics of El Bumpo.
Durio Peru
Ecuador
Tree broad, branches limber, spreading. Selected for superior hardiness. Fruit medium, quite dark green, mammillated, flavor good.
El Bumpo
Fruit conical, medium size, mammillated, not suited for commerce. Skin soft, practically edible. Flavor among the finest.
Favourite
Favourite Mt
Fino de Jete
Has skin type Impressa, are smooth or slightly concave at the edges. The fruit is round, oval, heart-shaped or kidney-shaped. The seeds are enclosed in the carpels and so do not detach easily, the flavour balances intense sweetness with slight acidity.
Fortuna
Cultivar was registered by Nino Cupaiuolo with the California Rare Fruit Growers in 1997. An important attribute of this cultivar is its early fruiting time with superior flavor.
Funchal
Cultivar from Madeira Island
Guayacuyán
Honeyhart
Medium, skin smooth, plated, yellowish green. Pulp has smooth texture, excellent flavor, very juicy.
Impresa
with "fingerprint" depressions
Juliana
Juniana
Kempsey
Kent (PK)
Knight
Tree has medium vigor, medium-sized pale green wavy leaves. Fruit has minor protuberances, a thin skin, a slightly grainy texture and is quite sweet.
Libby
Tree large. Fruit round conical; early harvest. Sweet, strong flavor.
Lisa
almost smooth
Local Serena
Lope Concha
Madeira
Bulky fruit usually with thick green peel. It has a heart shape, having a skin with some small protuberances. Its pulp is white, sweet, creamy, juicy, having a slightly acid and delicate, with a pronounced fragrance. The color of the skin can range from bright green, yellow-green or bronze-green. Cultivar from Madeira Island
Mateus-II
Cultivar from Madeira Island
Margarita
McPherson
Tree pyramidal, vigorous, to 9 metres (30 ft). Fruits small to medium in size, conical, dark green, not seedy. Flavor suggests banana, sweetness varies with temperature while maturing.
Mossman
Ñamas
Names
Nata
Tree vigorous, bears quickly, flowers profuse, tendency to self-pollinating. Fruits smooth, light green, conical, 0.7–1.1 kilograms (1.5–2.4 lb). Skin thin, tender. Flavor has good sweet-acid balance.
Negra
Orton
Ott
Tree strong growing. Fruit medium, heart shaped tuberculate, flesh yellow, seedy, very sweet. Matures early.
P43 Mt
P52 Mt
Papilonado
with fleshy, nipple-like protrusions
Perry Vidal
Cultivar from Madeira Island
Pierce
Tree is vigorous with large dark green leaves. Fruit is medium-sized elongated conically shaped with very smooth skin and a high sugar content.
Piña
Fruit of conical shape with very marked protuberances, medium size, with thin skin, dark green-opaque. White and juicy pulp, excellent aroma reminiscent of a pineapple. Late maturity.
Piña Mt
Pinchua
Thin-skinned
PK2 Mt
PK 31
Plomiza
Popocay
Q Mt
Reretai Mt
Rio Negro
Heart shaped fruits weighing 0.8–1 kilogram (1.8–2.2 lb)
Rugosa
Ryerson
Long-conical, smooth or fingerprinted, with thick, tough, green or yellow green skin; of fair quality; ships well. Leaves wavy or twisted.
Sabor
Sibling of "Big Sister". Fruit mammillated, varies in size, not usually large. Among the best in flavor.
San Miguel
Sander
Fruits with moderate number of seeds
Santa Julia
Selma
Pink flesh
Serenense Larga
Serenense Lisa
Smoothey
Spain
Small to medium, smooth, conical; banana flavor
Terciopelo or Felpa
Tetilado
with fleshy, nipple-like protrusions
Tocarema
Tuberculada
with conical protrusions having wartlike tips
Tumba
Umbonada
with rounded protrusions
Whaley
Tree moderately vigorous. Fruit medium to large elongated conical, tuberculate, light green, flavor good. Seed enclosed in an obtrusive sac of flesh.
White
Tree open, unkempt; to 11 metres (36 ft), needs forming. Fruit large, to 2 kilograms (4.4 lb), conical, with superficial small lumps (umbonate). Flesh juicy, flavor weak, suggesting mango-papaya.

== See also ==
- Lists of cultivars
