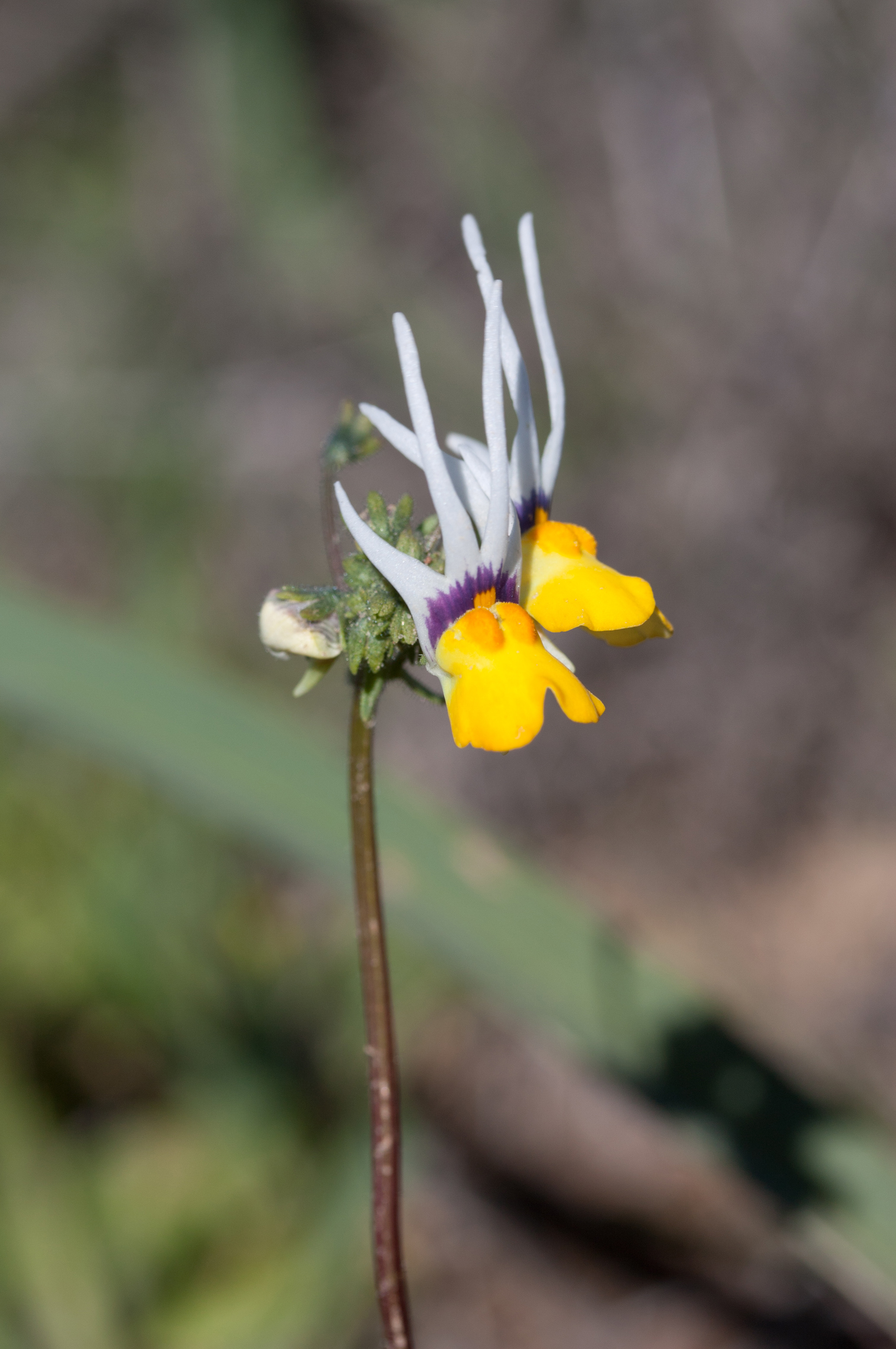
- Specimen found in Hantam National Botanical Garden, Nieuwoudtville, South Africa

Scientific classification
- Kingdom: Plantae
- Clade: Tracheophytes
- Clade: Angiosperms
- Clade: Eudicots
- Clade: Asterids
- Order: Lamiales
- Family: Scrophulariaceae
- Genus: Nemesia
- Species: N. cheiranthus

Binomial name
- Nemesia cheiranthus E.Mey. ex Benth.

= Nemesia cheiranthus =

Species of flowering plant

Nemesia cheiranthus, also known as the long-eared nemesia, is an annual plant native to South Africa, with white and yellow flowers, occasionally with purple markings. The upper petals are long and thin, and there are two typically orange bulbous protuberances on the otherwise yellow lower lip, which may be centrally indented. The leaves are toothed and lance-shaped. It typically grows to 40 cm (16 in) and is distributed mainly in Namaqualand on sandy soils.

Nemesia cheiranthus is a popular garden plant with two main cultivars, 'Shooting Stars' and 'Masquerade'.
