= Nemesia karasbergensis =

Conservation status
- Least Concern (IUCN 3.1)

Scientific classification
- Kingdom: Plantae
- Clade: Tracheophytes
- Clade: Angiosperms
- Clade: Eudicots
- Clade: Asterids
- Order: Lamiales
- Family: Scrophulariaceae
- Genus: Nemesia
- Species: N. karasbergensis

Binomial name
- Nemesia karasbergensis L.Bolus

Species of flowering plant

Nemesia karasbergensis is a species of plant in the family Scrophulariaceae. It is endemic to Namibia. Its natural habitat is rocky areas.
