= Nemesia glaucescens =

Scientific classification
- Kingdom: Plantae
- Clade: Tracheophytes
- Clade: Angiosperms
- Clade: Eudicots
- Clade: Asterids
- Order: Lamiales
- Family: Scrophulariaceae
- Genus: Nemesia
- Species: N. glaucescens

Binomial name
- Nemesia glaucescens Hiern

South African plant species

Nemesia glaucescens is a species of plant endemic to South Africa. It belongs to the figwort family.

== Description ==
This annual erect herb grows 150–260 mm (5.9–10.2 in) tall. It has a slender triangular furrowed stem. It is mostly hairless, but it is hairy below. The internodes are mostly longer than the lance-shaped oppositely arranged leaves. They are hairy with few or no teeth. The leaves mostly grow directly on the stem, but the lower leaves may have a short stalk.

The terminal flowers are borne in broad racemes, each of which contains only a few flowers. The bracts are lance-shaped and re shorter than the leaves. The stalks holding them are slender with narrow glands. The calyx segments are linear and curved. They are covered in glands and dense, fine hairs. The petals are pale with a rounded lower lip and no margin at the tip. The palate (a rounded projection at the opening of the tube) is hairy and the spur is conical.

== Distribution and habitat ==
This species in endemic to the Northern Cape of South Africa. It grows in Modderfonetin in Little Namaqualand.
