= Nemesia grandiflora =

Scientific classification
- Kingdom: Plantae
- Clade: Tracheophytes
- Clade: Angiosperms
- Clade: Eudicots
- Clade: Asterids
- Order: Lamiales
- Family: Scrophulariaceae
- Genus: Nemesia
- Species: N. grandiflora

Binomial name
- Nemesia grandiflora Diels

South African plant species

Nemesia grandiflora is a species of plant from South Africa.

== Description ==
This plant is an erect perennial herb. It may have a simple or branched growth form and is nearly hairless. It grows 20–50 cm (7.9–19.7 in) tall. Plants have two kinds of leaves. The root leaves have an oblong shape and are wedge-shaped at the base. They grow on stalks. The stem leaves are linear and grow directly on the stems. The margins have few teeth.

The floral leaves are bract-like. The inflorescence is glandular with lance-shaped or linear calyx segments. The corolla tubes are oblong with large lower lobes. The throat is bearded with a shaggy opening. The spur is short and conical. The capsule is oval shaped with two short horns.

== Distribution and habitat ==
This species is endemic to the Western Cape of South Africa. It grows in Hopefield, near Malmsbury.
