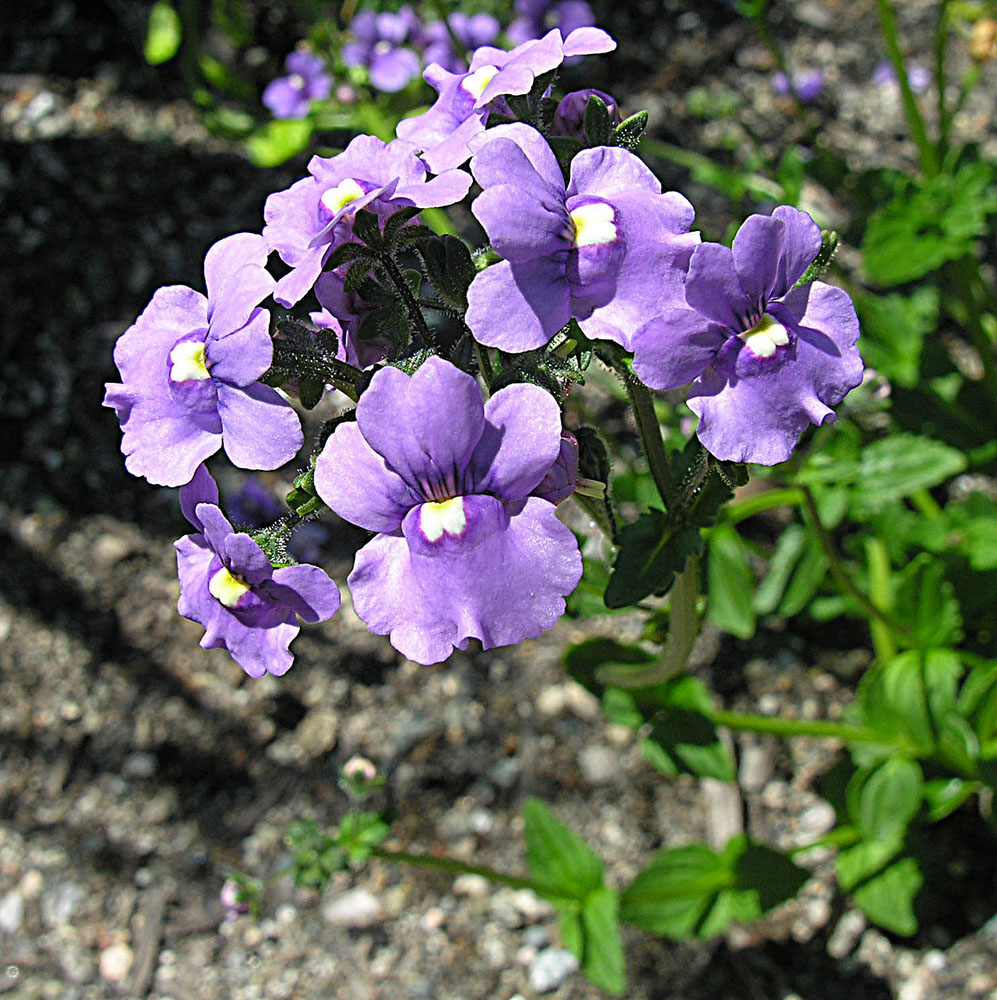
- Nemesia caerulea in South Africa.

Scientific classification
- Kingdom: Plantae
- Clade: Tracheophytes
- Clade: Angiosperms
- Clade: Eudicots
- Clade: Asterids
- Order: Lamiales
- Family: Scrophulariaceae
- Genus: Nemesia
- Species: N. caerulea

Binomial name
- Nemesia caerulea Hiern

= Nemesia caerulea =

Species of flowering plant

Nemesia caerulea is a blue- to purple- flowered herbaceous perennial member of the family Scrophulariaceae. The plant is native to the Cape Floristic Province of southwestern South Africa, where it grows at low elevations on fully exposed north-facing and northwest-facing slopes in association with other native grasses and forbs. Its chromosome number is 2n=18.

It produces many small flowers in shades of pink, blue and white (the Latin caerulea means "dark blue"). The flowers are two-lipped, the upper lip with four lobes and the lower lip with two lobes. In cultivation the two lips are often different colours.

In temperate regions it is usually grown as an annual. The cultivar 'Sea Mist' has gained the Royal Horticultural Society's Award of Garden Merit.
