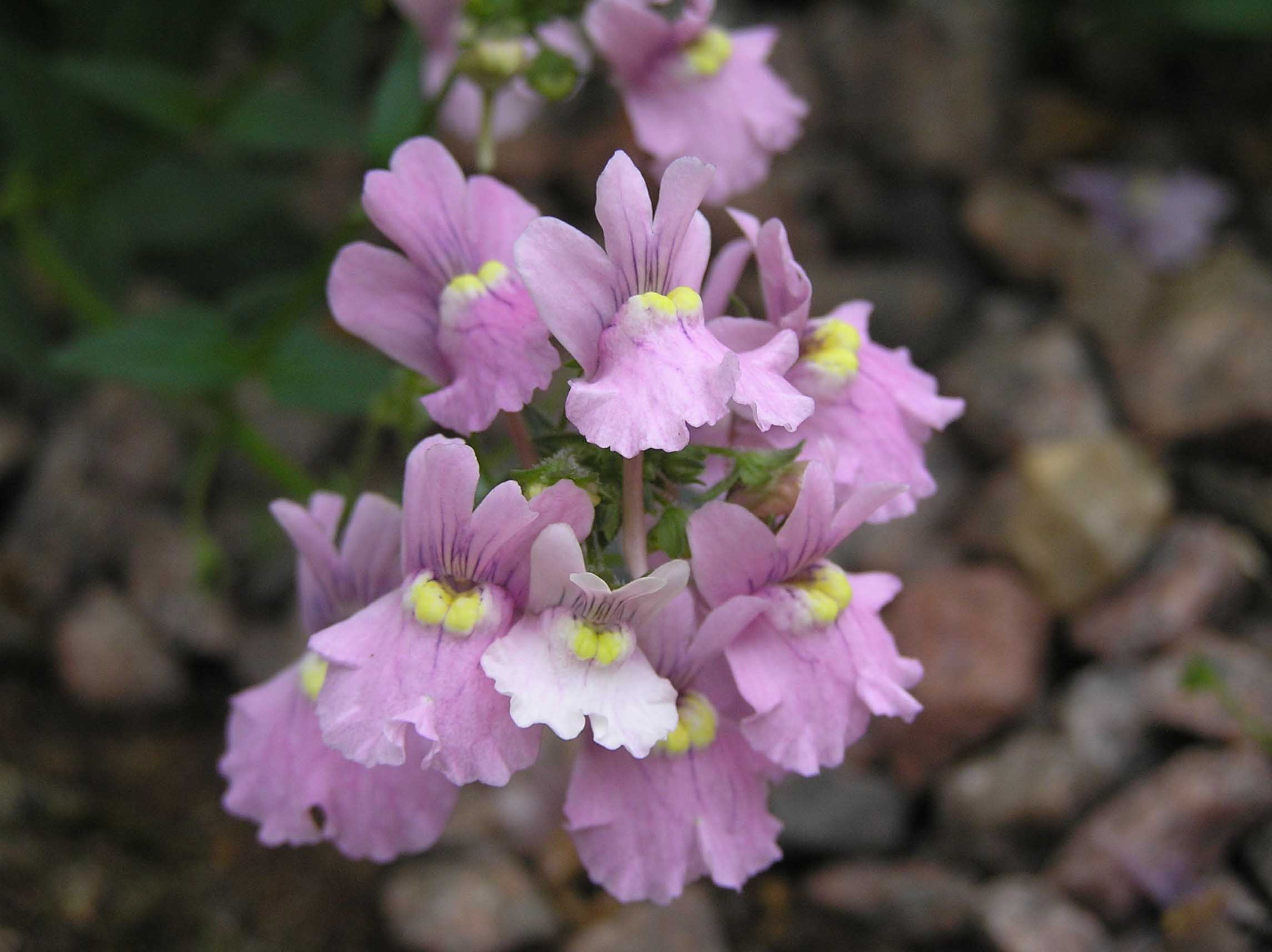
- Flowers

Scientific classification
- Kingdom: Plantae
- Clade: Embryophytes
- Clade: Tracheophytes
- Clade: Angiosperms
- Clade: Eudicots
- Clade: Asterids
- Order: Lamiales
- Family: Scrophulariaceae
- Genus: Nemesia
- Species: N. denticulata

Binomial name
- Nemesia denticulata (Benth.) A.L.Grant ex Fourc.

Synonyms
- List: Diascia denticulata Benth.; Nemesia natalitia Sond.

= Nemesia denticulata =

Species of flowering plant

Nemesia denticulata, the toothed aloha, is a species of flowering plant in the genus Nemesia of the figwort family Scrophulariaceae. It is native to the Eastern Cape and KwaZulu-Natal provinces of South Africa. A mat‑forming perennial useful for borders, it has gained the Royal Horticultural Society's Award of Garden Merit.

The Latin specific epithet denticulata means "slightly toothed", referring to the notched petal edges.
