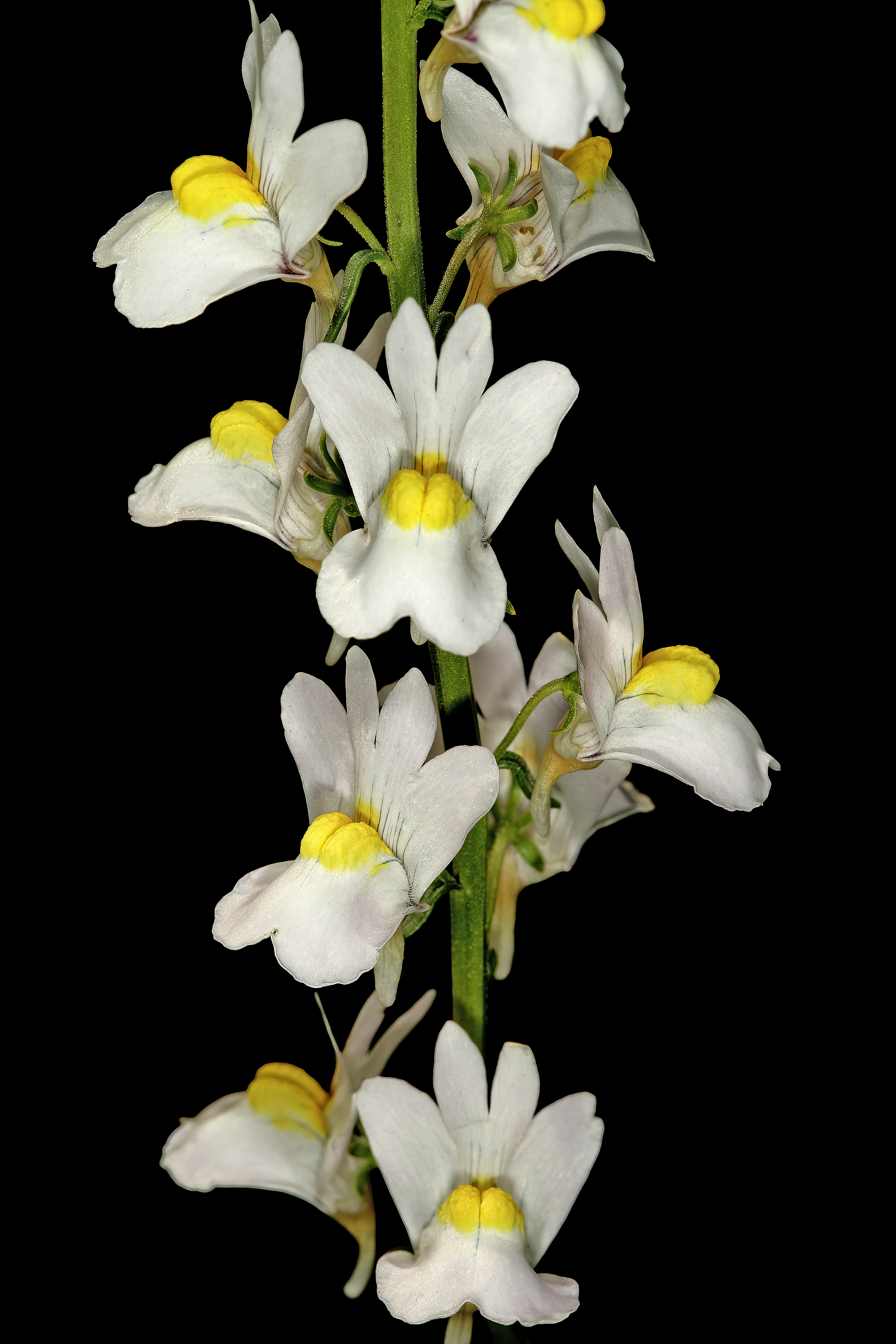
- Nemesia linearis flowers near Calitzdorp in South Africa

Scientific classification
- Kingdom: Plantae
- Clade: Tracheophytes
- Clade: Angiosperms
- Clade: Eudicots
- Clade: Asterids
- Order: Lamiales
- Family: Scrophulariaceae
- Genus: Nemesia
- Species: N. linearis

Binomial name
- Nemesia linearis Vent.

Synonyms
- Nemesia capensis subsp. linearis (Vent.) Fourc.; Nemesia capensis var. linearis (Vent.) Fourc.; Nemesia fruticans subsp. linearis (Vent.) Norl.; Nemesia fruticans var. linearis (Vent.) Norl.

= Nemesia linearis =

Southern African plant species

Nemesia linearis, also known as the witleeubekkie in Afrikaans (translates roughly to white lion mouth), is a species of plant from southern Africa. It is found in South Africa and Namibia.

== Description ==
This annual grows 10–90 cm (3.9–35.4 in) tall. It has an unpleasant fetid smell. The ridged stems are erect and tufted at the base. They may be simple or may branch at the base. The leaves either grow directly on the stems or grow on short stalks. They are linear or lance-shaped. The lower leaves have toothed margins while upper leaves have entire margins.

Plants produce inflorescences made up of many flowers between August and January. They are grouped in loose corymbs and have dot-like hairs on the bracts, stalk and calyx. The bracts are lance-shaped and lack teeth.The corolla is white, although it may be tinted in mauve with pink or purple veins. The entrance to the tube is yellow and has a biconvex shape. The conical spur is up to 4 mm (0.16 in) long.

The fruit is an oblong capsule that narrows very slightly towards the tip. The base and upper margin are rounded. It has no horns.

== Distribution and habitat ==
Nemesia linearis is endemic to South Africa and Namibia. In South Africa it grows in the Eastern Cape, Northern Cape, Western Cape and Free State provinces. This plant prefers dry habitats. It grows in well-drained sandy or gravelly soil, often in streambeds. It grows in open areas where it will not be shaded by rocks or other plants.
