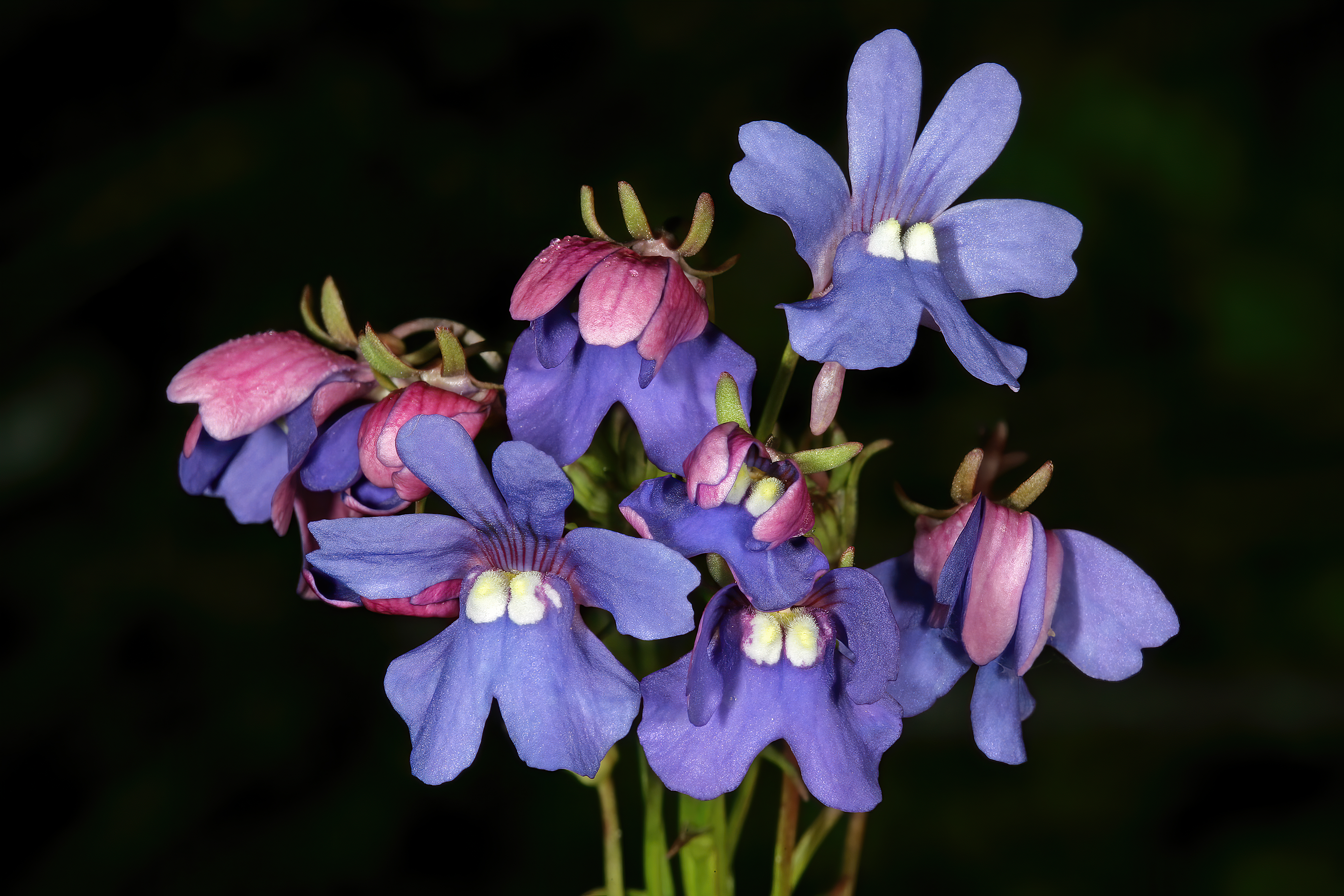

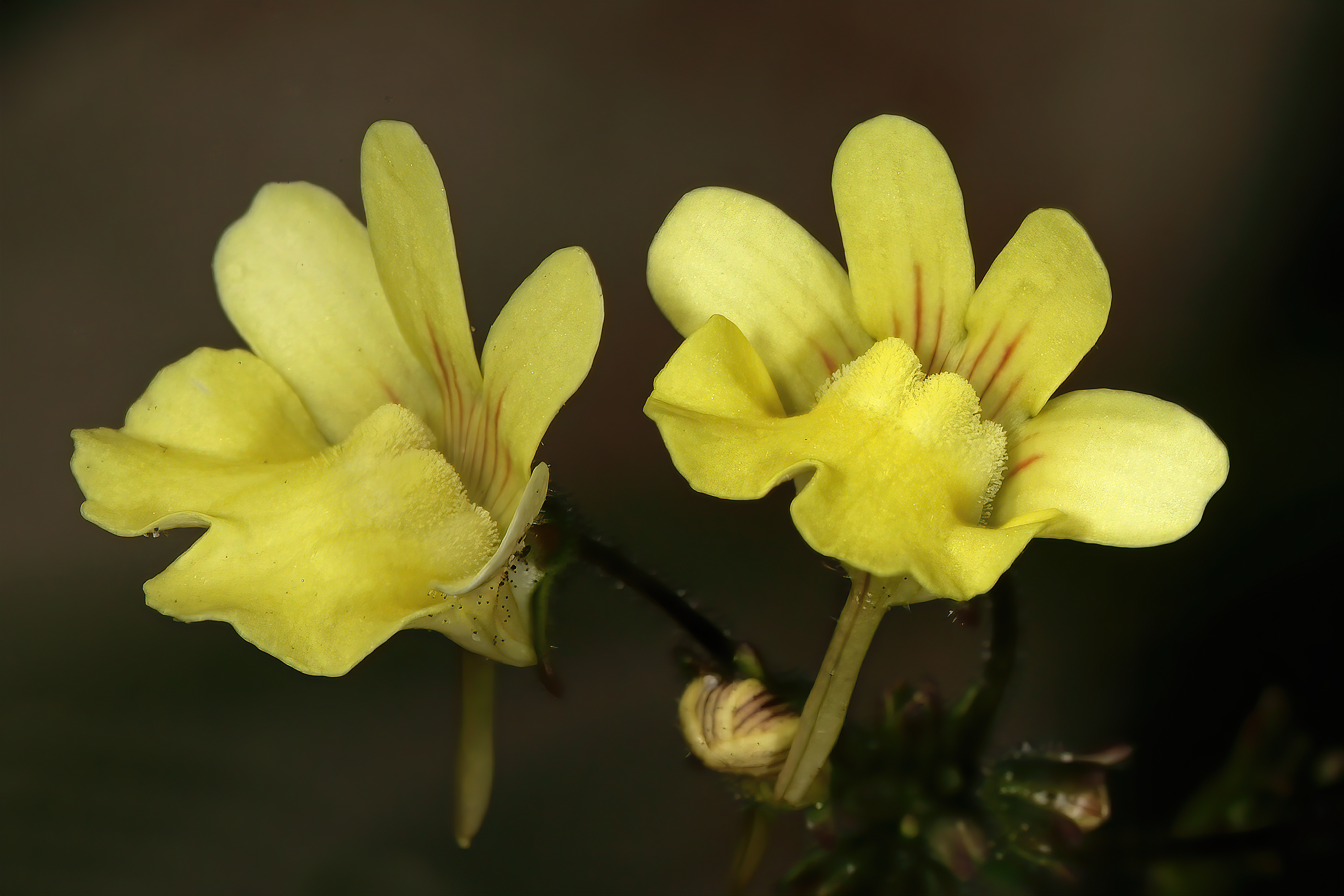

Conservation status
- Least Concern (SANBI Red List)

Scientific classification
- Kingdom: Plantae
- Clade: Tracheophytes
- Clade: Angiosperms
- Clade: Eudicots
- Clade: Asterids
- Order: Lamiales
- Family: Scrophulariaceae
- Genus: Nemesia
- Species: N. versicolor

Binomial name
- Nemesia versicolor E.Mey. ex Benth.

Synonyms
- Nemesia compacta Hort.; Nemesia compacta Voss; Nemesia versicolor E.Mey.; Nemesia versicolor f. compacta Voss; Nemesia versicolor subsp. compacta hort.; Nemesia versicolor subsp. compacta hort. ex Voss

= Nemesia versicolor =

Species of flowering plant endemic to South Africa

Nemesia versicolor (also known as the variable lionface or the Afrikaans names: kappieblommetjie and weeskindertjies) is a species of perennial flowering plant in the family Scrophulariaceae. It is endemic to the Northern and Western Cape Provinces of South Africa.

== Description ==
Nemesia versicolor has opposite, ovate to oblong-lanceolate leaves. The corolla is variable in colour.

== Range ==
Nemesia versicolor is endemic to the Northern Cape and Western Cape provinces, but it is also found in the Eastern Cape.

== Habitat ==
Nemesia versicolor is found in a subtropical biome on the coast.

== Taxonomy ==
According to Plants of the World Online, Nemesia versicolor contains the following varieties:

- Nemesia versicolor var. versicolor
- Nemesia versicolor var. oxyceras Benth.

== Gallery ==
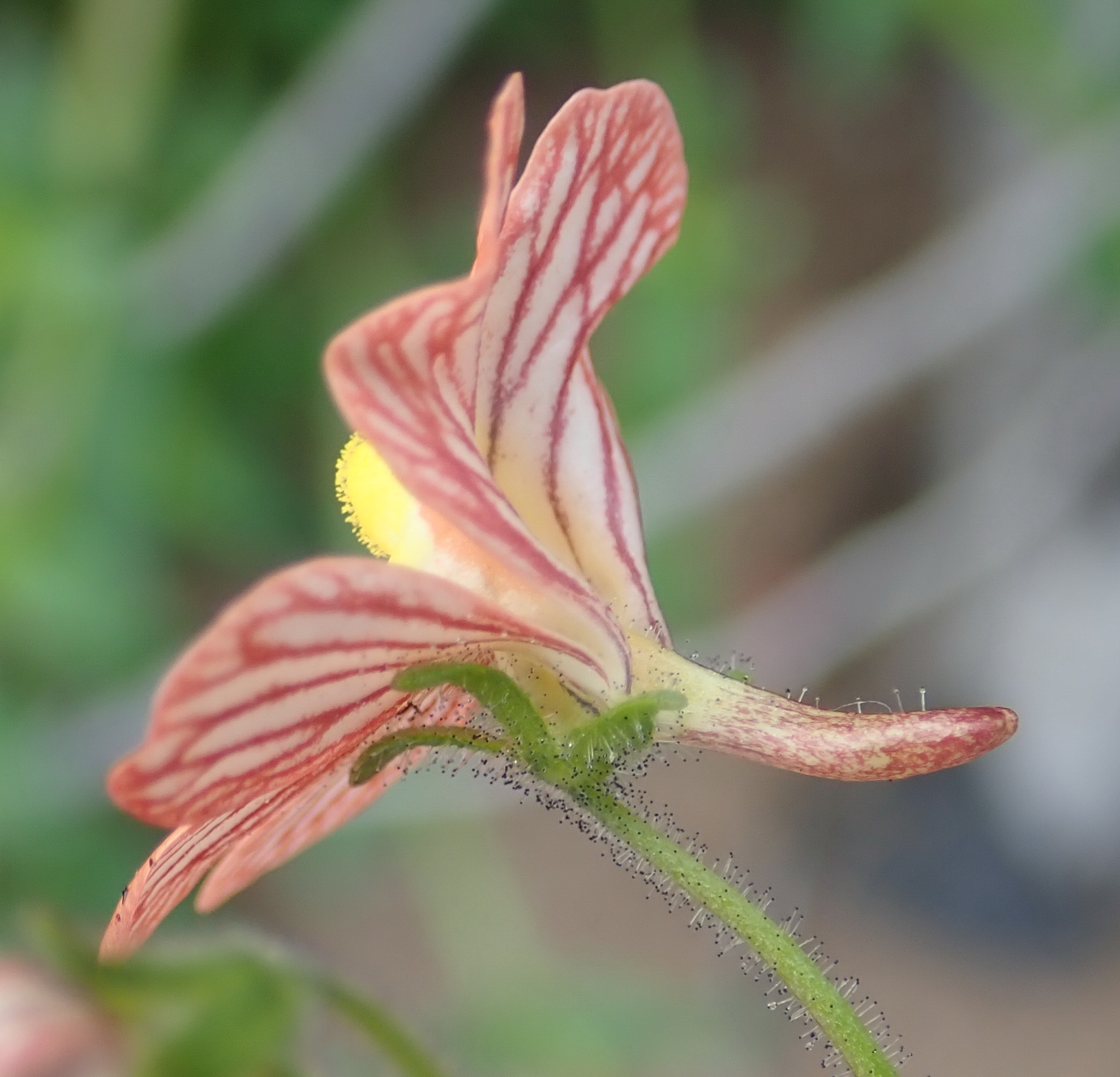
Side view

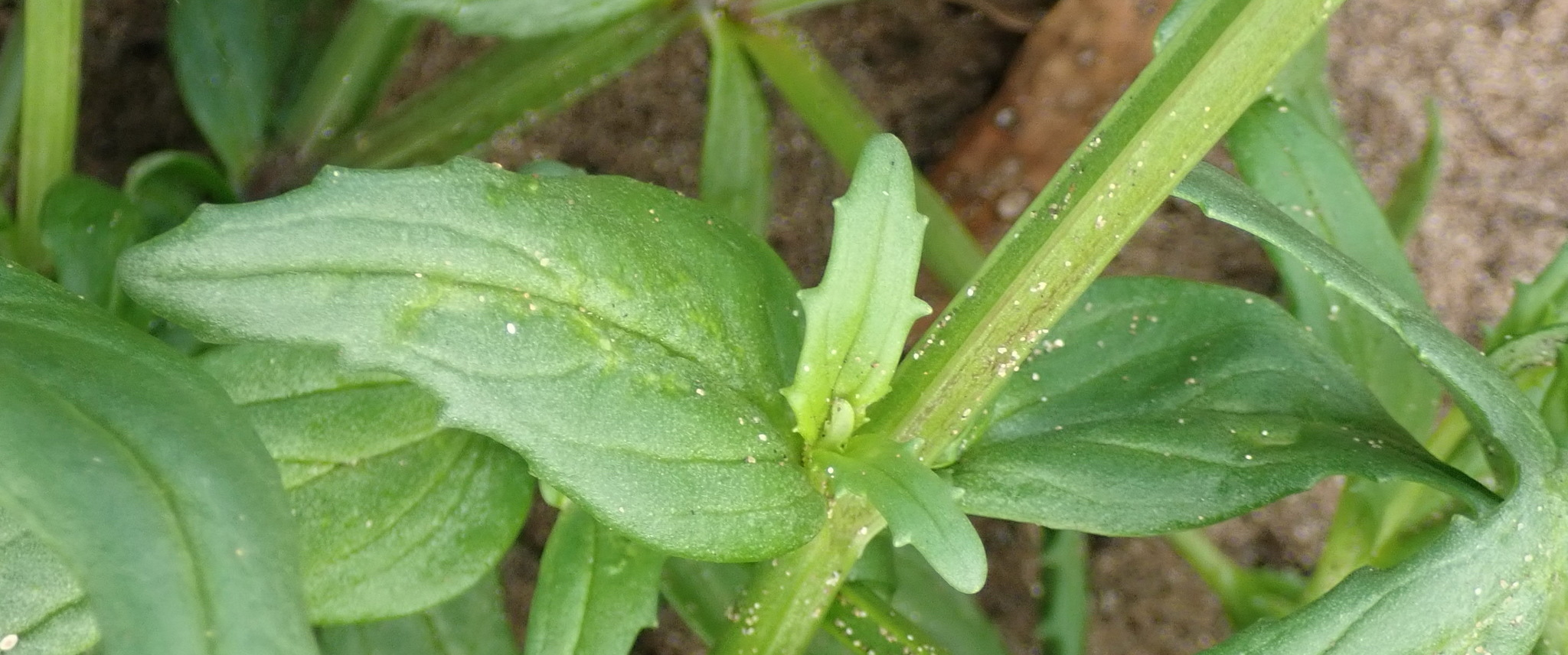
Opposite leaves

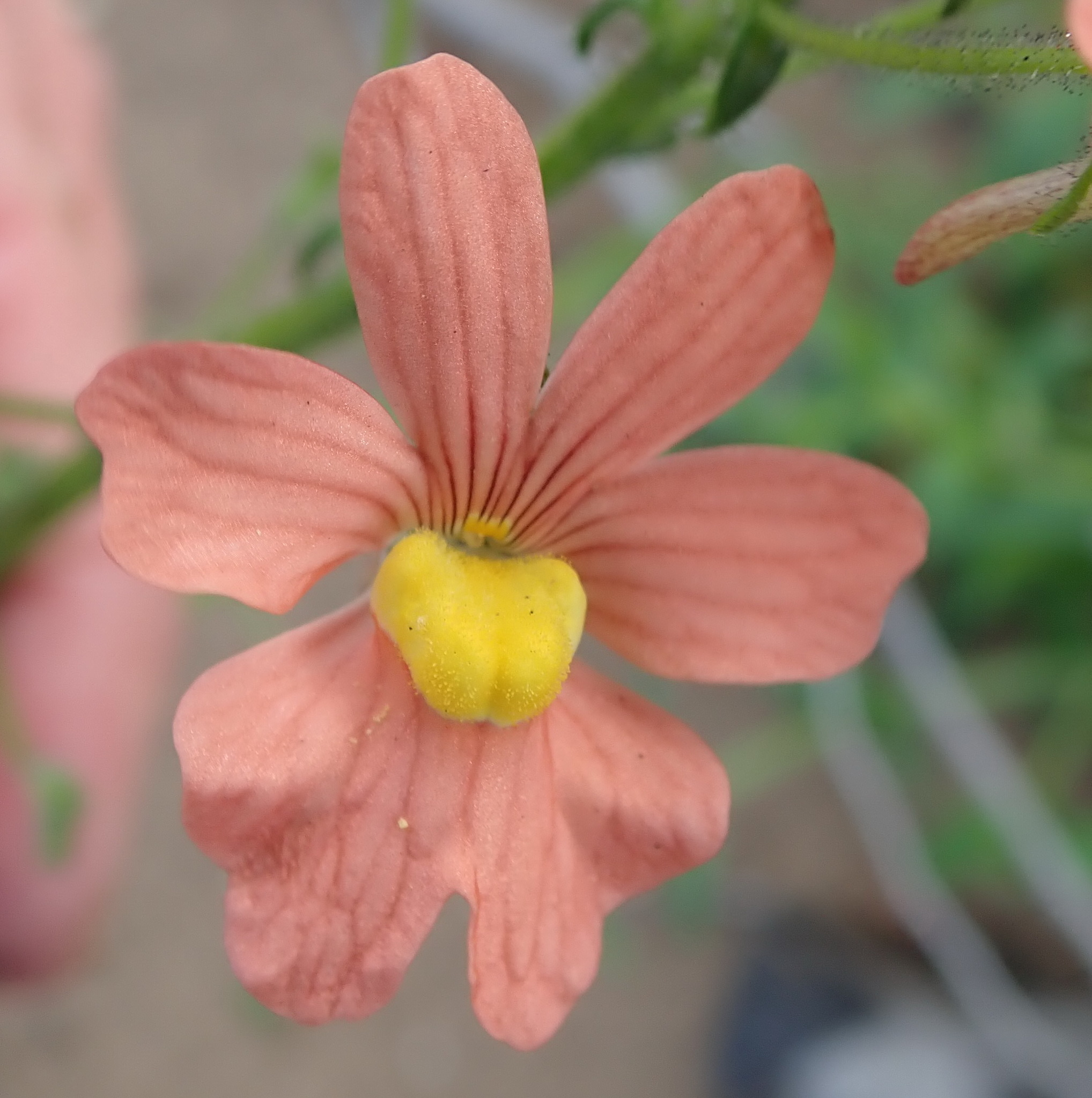

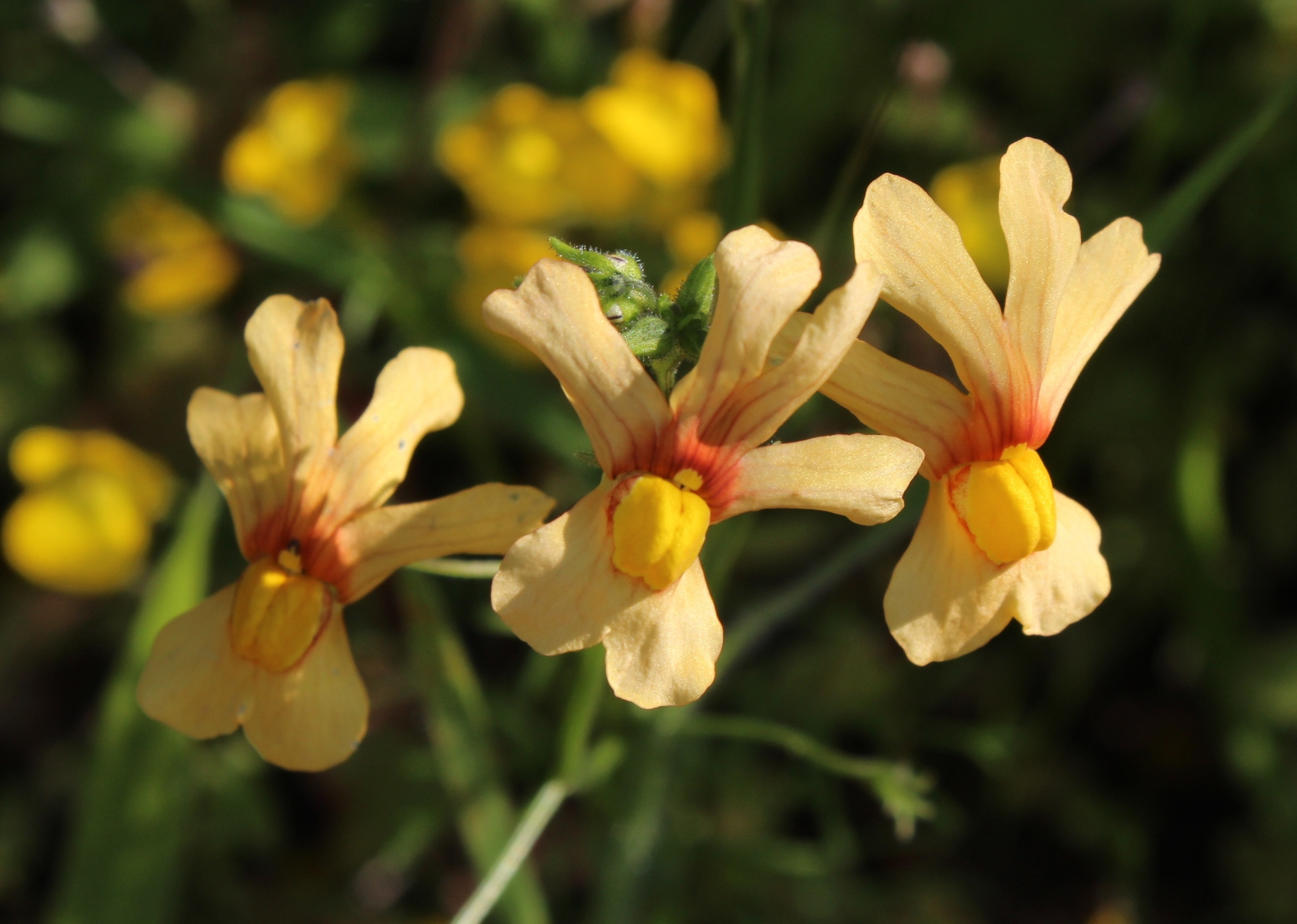
Nemesia versicolor versicolor

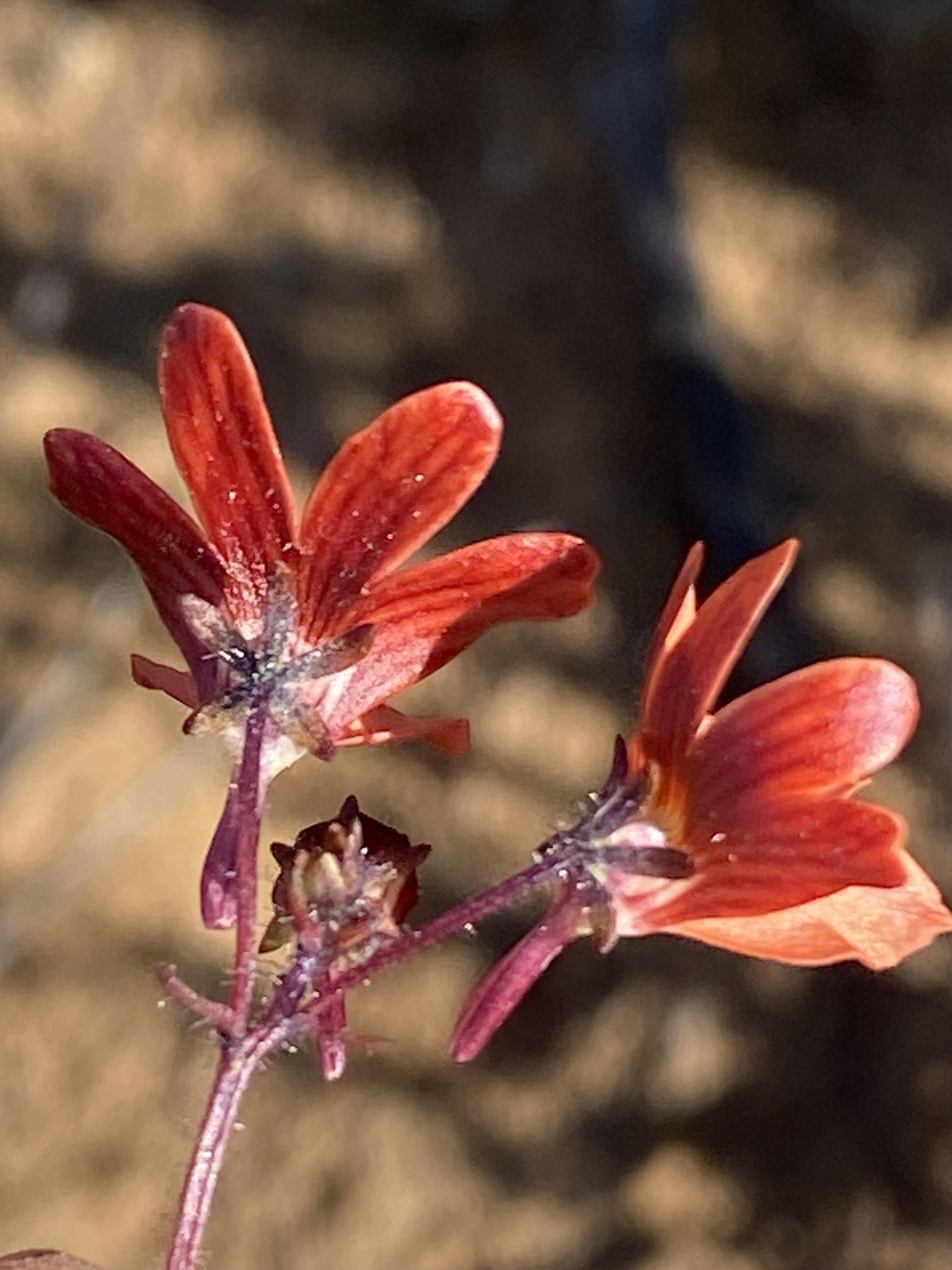
