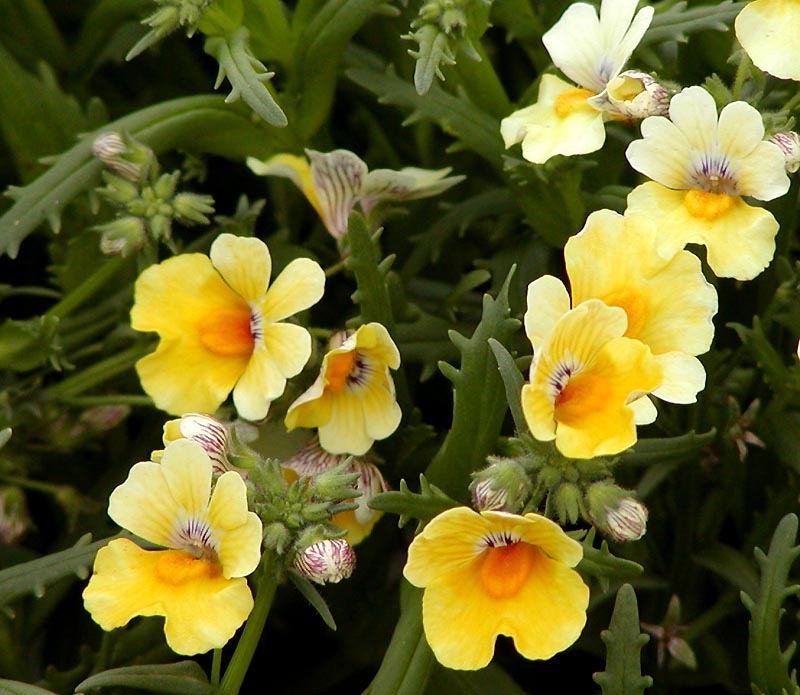
- 'Sunsatia Banana'

Scientific classification
- Kingdom: Plantae
- Clade: Tracheophytes
- Clade: Angiosperms
- Clade: Eudicots
- Clade: Asterids
- Order: Lamiales
- Family: Scrophulariaceae
- Tribe: Hemimerideae
- Genus: Nemesia; Vent. (year?), Bot. Phan.

= Nemesia (plant) =

Genus of flowering plants

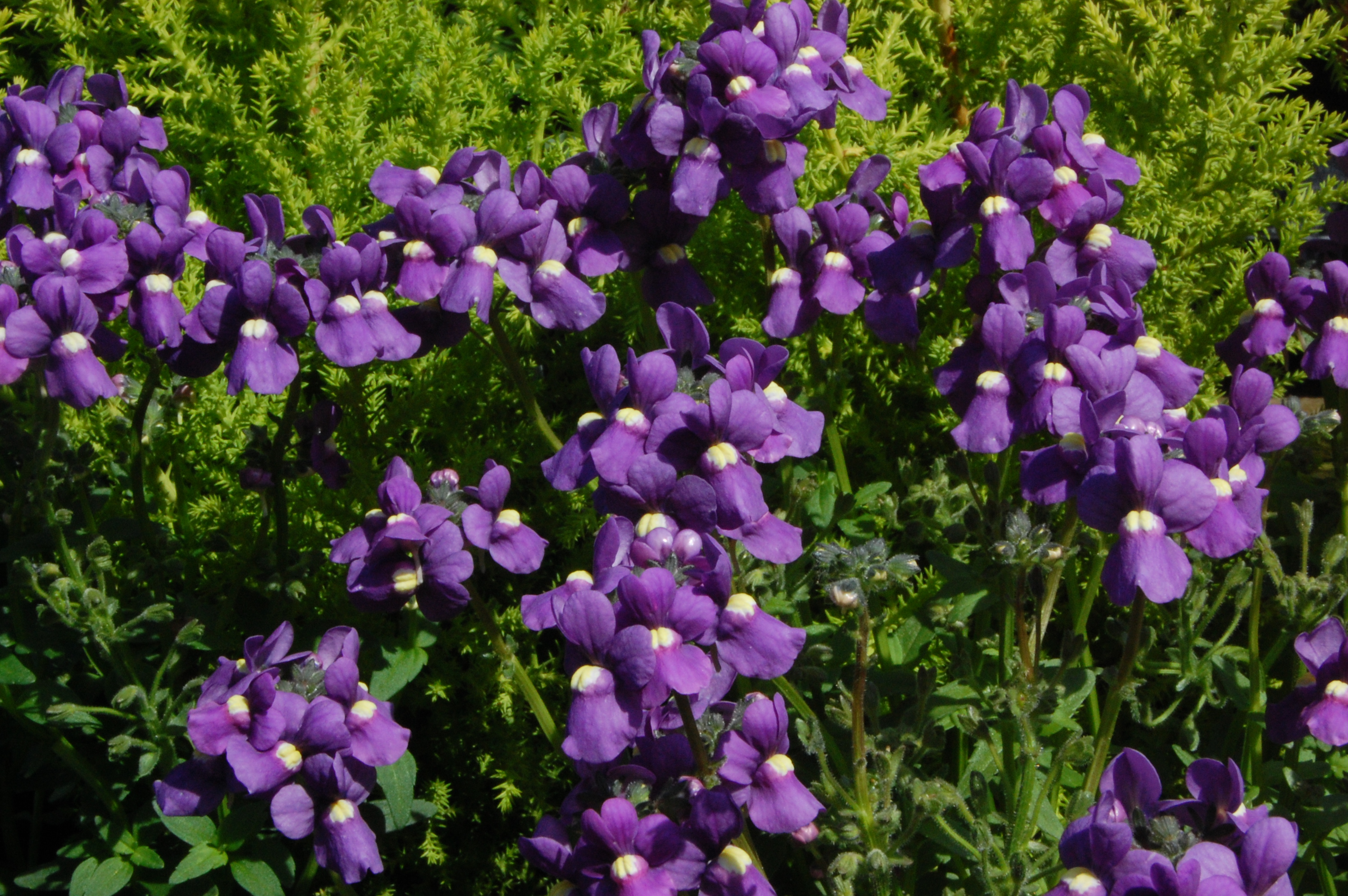
'Fleurie Blue'

Nemesia is a genus of annuals, perennials and sub-shrubs which are native to sandy coasts or disturbed ground in South Africa. Numerous hybrids have been selected, and the annual cultivars are popular with gardeners as bedding plants. In temperate regions they are usually treated as half-hardy, grown from seed in heat, and planted out after all danger of frost has passed.

The flowers are two-lipped, with the upper lip consisting of four lobes and the lower lip two lobes.

The following cultivars have gained the Royal Horticultural Society's Award of Garden Merit:-

- Penblue
- Innocence
- Fleuron
- Nemesia denticulata

== Species ==
Species include:

- Nemesia acornis K.E.Steiner
- Nemesia acuminata Benth.
- Nemesia affinis Benth.
- Nemesia albiflora N.E.Br.
- Nemesia anfracta Hiern
- Nemesia angustifolia Grant ex Range
- Nemesia anisocarpa E.Mey. ex Benth.
- Nemesia azurea Diels
- Nemesia barbata (Thunb.) Benth.
- Nemesia bicornis (L.) Pers.
- Nemesia bodkinii Bolus
- Nemesia brevicalcarata Schltr.
- Nemesia caerulea Hiern
- Nemesia calcarata E.Mey. ex Benth.
- Nemesia cheiranthus E.Mey. ex Benth.
- Nemesia chrysolopha Diels
- Nemesia cynanchifolia Benth.
- Nemesia deflexa Grant ex K.E.Steiner
- Nemesia denticulata (Benth.) Grant ex Fourc.
- Nemesia diffusa Benth.
- Nemesia euryceras Schltr.
- Nemesia fleckii Thell.
- Nemesia floribunda Lehm.
- Nemesia fruticans (Thunb.) Benth.
- Nemesia glabriuscula Hilliard & B.L.Burtt
- Nemesia glaucescens Hiern
- Nemesia gracilis Benth.
- Nemesia grandiflora Diels
- Nemesia hanoverica Hiern
- Nemesia hemiptera K.E.Steiner
- Nemesia ionantha Diels
- Nemesia karasbergensis L.Bolus
- Nemesia karroensis Bond
- Nemesia lanceolata Hiern
- Nemesia leipoldtii Hiern
- Nemesia ligulata E.Mey. ex Benth.
- Nemesia lilacina N.E.Br.
- Nemesia linearis Vent.
- Nemesia lucida Benth.
- Nemesia macrocarpa (Aiton) Druce
- Nemesia macroceras Schltr.
- Nemesia marlothii Grant ex Range
- Nemesia maxii Hiern
- Nemesia melissifolia Benth.
- Nemesia micrantha Hiern
- Nemesia pageae L.Bolus
- Nemesia pallida Hiern
- Nemesia parviflora Benth.
- Nemesia petiolina Hiern
- Nemesia picta Schltr.
- Nemesia pinnata (L.f.) E.Mey. ex Benth.
- Nemesia platysepala Diels
- Nemesia psammophila Schltr.
- Nemesia pubescens Benth.
- Nemesia pulchella Schltr. ex Hiern
- Nemesia rupicola Hilliard
- Nemesia saccata E.Mey. ex Benth.
- Nemesia silvatica Hilliard
- Nemesia strumosa (Benth.) Benth.
- Nemesia umbonata (Hiern) Hilliard & B.L.Burtt
- Nemesia versicolor E.Mey. ex Benth.
- Nemesia violiflora Roessler
- Nemesia viscosa E.Mey. ex Benth.
- Nemesia williamsonii K.E.Steiner
- Nemesia zimbabwensis Rendle

== See also ==
- List of Nemesia cultivars
