= List of Nemesia cultivars =

Many Nemesia cultivars have been developed for ornamental horticulture.

Cultivar	Image	Flower colour	Height	Reference
'Blue Bird'		purple	15 to 30 cm	
'Blue Lagoon'		violet	15 to 30 cm	
'Compact Innocence'		white		
'Compact Pink Innocence'		pink	15 to 30 cm	
'Safari Pink'		pink	15 to 30 cm	
'Safari Plum'		purple	15 to 30 cm	
'Safari Violet'		purple	15 to 30 cm	
'Safari Wild Rose'		rose	15 to 30 cm	
'Sunsatia Banana'		yellow	15 to 30 cm	
'Sunsatia Coconut'		white	15 to 30 cm	
'Sunsatia Cranberry'		pink	15 to 30 cm	
'Sunsatia Lemon'		yellow	15 to 30 cm	
'Sunsatia Mango'			15 to 30 cm	
'Sunsatia Peach'		coral, apricot and white	15 to 30 cm	
'Sunsatia Pineapple'		gold	15 to 30 cm	
'Sunsatia Raspberry'		red-purple	15 to 30 cm	
