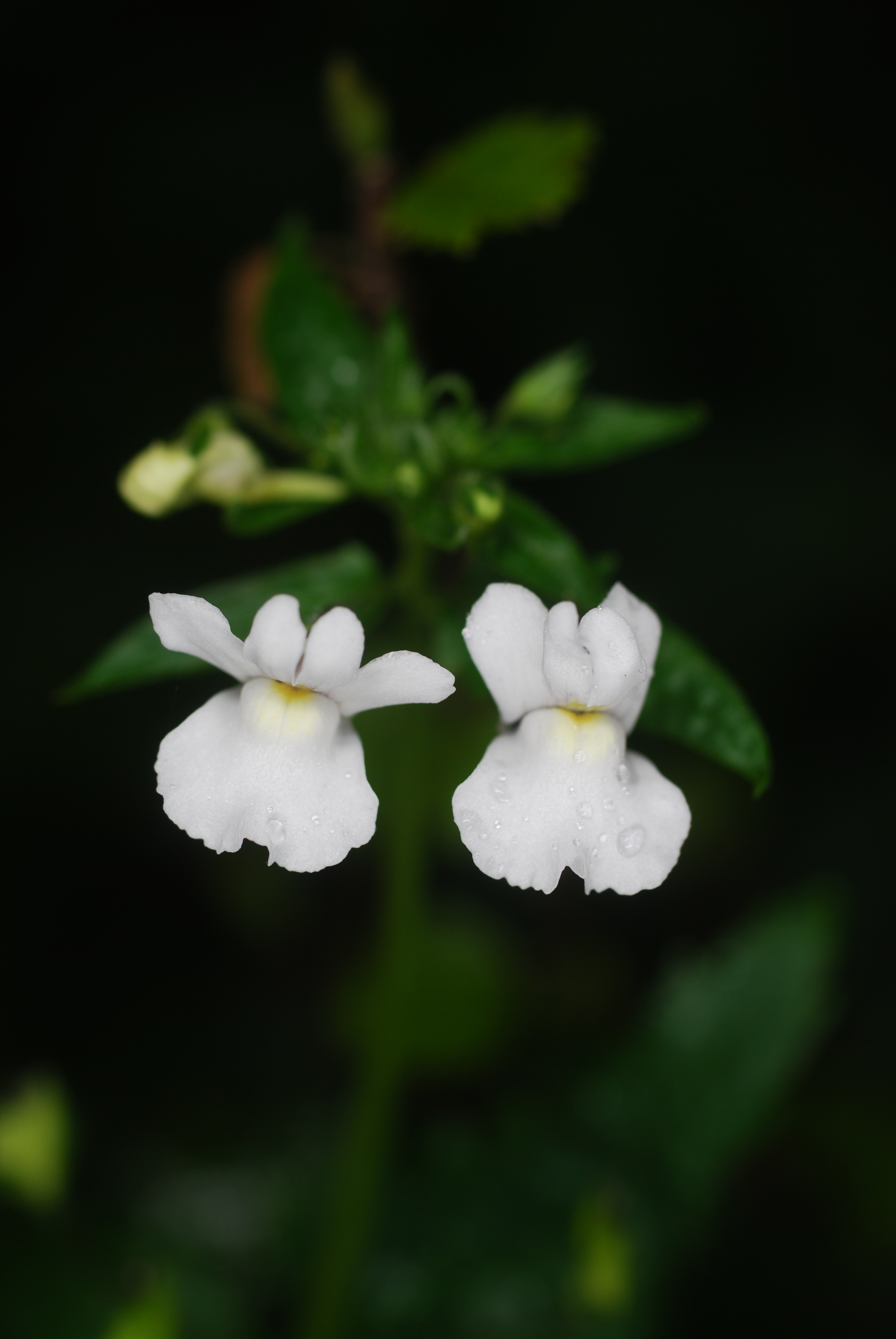

Scientific classification
- Kingdom: Plantae
- Clade: Embryophytes
- Clade: Tracheophytes
- Clade: Spermatophytes
- Clade: Angiosperms
- Clade: Eudicots
- Clade: Asterids
- Order: Lamiales
- Family: Scrophulariaceae
- Genus: Nemesia
- Species: N. floribunda

Binomial name
- Nemesia floribunda Lehm.

= Nemesia floribunda =

Species of flowering plant

Nemesia floribunda is a species of flowering plant in the family Scrophulariaceae. It is called by the common names Cape Jewels and Fleshy Nemesia and is an erect annual dicotyledon herb that is native to South Africa, but has naturalised elsewhere. It is commonly cultivated by home gardeners.

== Description ==
Nemesia floribunda grows to a height of between 30.48 centimetres (12 in) and 60 centimetres (24 in). Its flowers are 10–15 mm (0.4–0.6 in) in diameter, and are white, with a pale yellow throat. The flowers are also bilobed, with the top lobe being shorter than the bottom; 3-4 mm (0.1 in) (upper lip) and 5–6 mm (0.2 in) (lower lip) respectively. The capsule is 10-12 mm long (0.4 in) and 5–6 mm wide (0.3 in). It has 3–12 cm (1.2–4.7 in) long leaves that are shortened and rounded with a wavy blade and narrow tip. Its seeds are 1 millimetre (0 in) with large wings, and the plant flowers between February and September.

== Habitat and ecosystem ==
Nemesia floribunda is typically found in subtropical environments, specifically nearby dunes with lupin and elder shrubs. It is sometimes found in and around scrub, forest margins, on roadsides, and in the open forest and its frequented by bees.

== Taxonomy ==
Nemesia floribunda was described by the German botanist Johann Georg Christian Lehmann, but was originally discovered and collected by Christian Friedrich Ecklon.

== Distribution ==
Nemesia floribunda is native to South Africa, but has naturalised in New Zealand, with main populations in the Dunedin area, and Nelson area. There are observations of wild Nemesia floribunda found as far north as Palmerston North, and as far south as Milton. Within South Africa, Nemesia floribunda is native to Cape Provinces, Free State, and Lesotho regions. There is at least one wild, confirmed sighting of the plant in the United Kingdom just outside of the Royal Botanic Garden Edinburgh. Additionally, it is commonly grown in home and botanical gardens across the United States.
