= Plant variety (law) =

Legal term

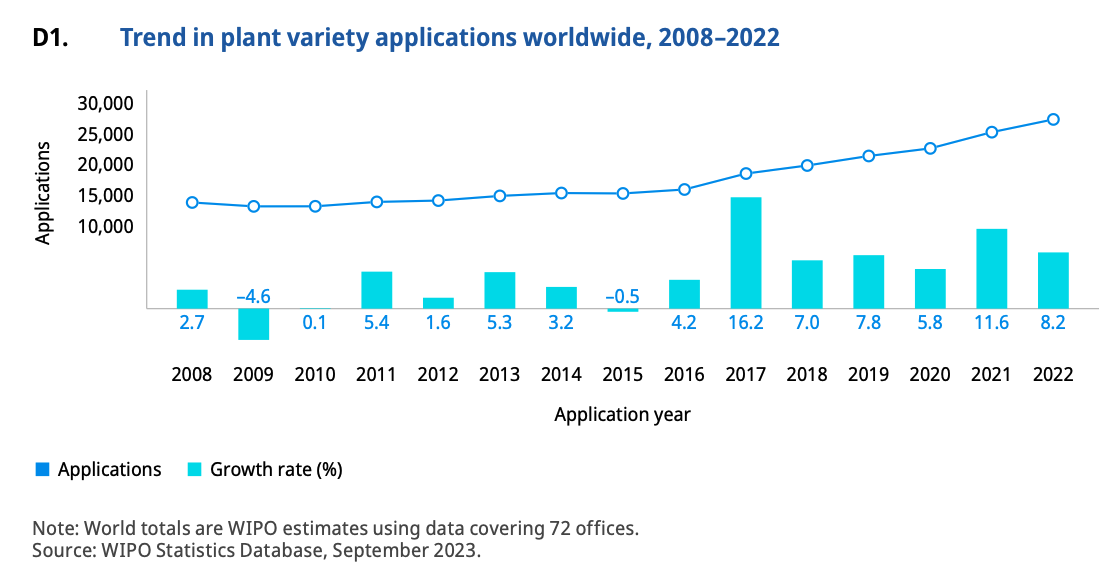
Plant variety applications by region, 2012 and 2022. WIPI 2023.

Plant variety is a legal term, following the International Union for the Protection of New Varieties of Plants (UPOV) Convention. Recognition of a cultivated plant (a cultivar) as a "variety" in this particular sense provides its breeder with some legal protection, so-called plant breeders' rights, depending to some extent on the internal legislation of the UPOV signatory countries, such as the Plant Variety Protection Act in the US.

This "variety" (which will differ in status according to national law) should not be confused with the international taxonomic rank of "variety" (regulated by the International Code of Nomenclature for algae, fungi, and plants), nor with the term "cultivar" (regulated by the International Code of Nomenclature for Cultivated Plants). Some horticulturists use "variety" imprecisely; for example, viticulturists almost always refer to grape cultivars as "grape varieties".

The EU has established a system that grants intellectual property rights to new plant varieties called Community plant variety right. It is valid throughout the EU and is in line with TRIPS/WTO agreements and the UPOV 1991 convention.

Around 27,260 plant variety applications were filed worldwide in 2022, up 8.2% on 2021 – a seventh consecutive year of growth. China contributed the majority of global growth, followed by the United Kingdom.

== See also ==
- Lists of cultivars
- Protection of Plant Varieties and Farmers' Rights Act, 2001 of India
