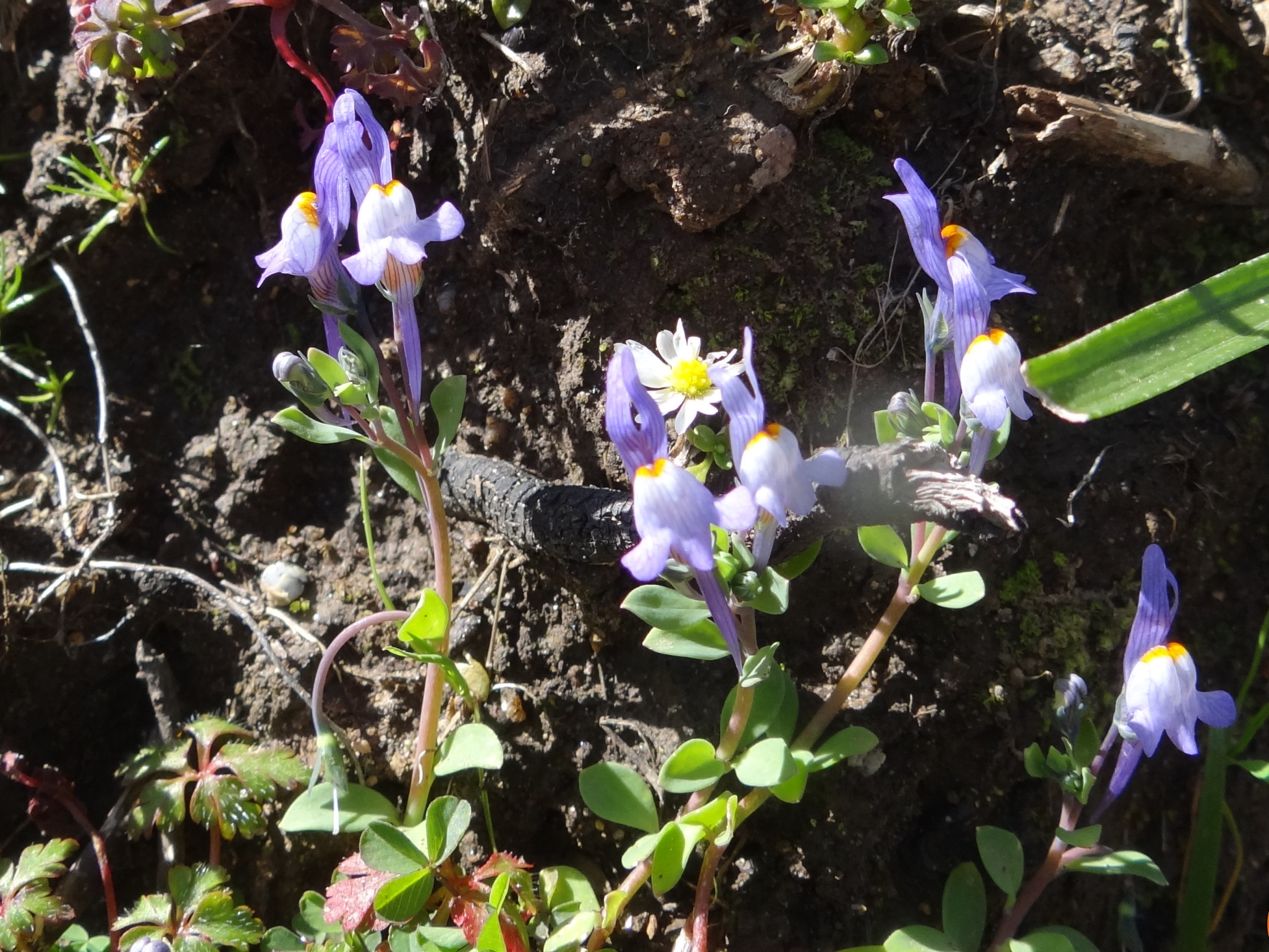
- A nectar spur and a bright yellow "tongue" spot, as in these Linaria reflexa flowers, are widespread traits among the Antirrhineae

Scientific classification
- Kingdom: Plantae
- Clade: Tracheophytes
- Clade: Angiosperms
- Clade: Eudicots
- Clade: Asterids
- Order: Lamiales
- Family: Plantaginaceae
- Tribe: Antirrhineae; Dumort.

Genera
- About 30, see text

= Antirrhineae =

Tribe of flowering plants

The Antirrhineae are one of the 12 tribes of the family Plantaginaceae. It contains the toadflax relatives, such as snapdragons.

== Description and uses ==
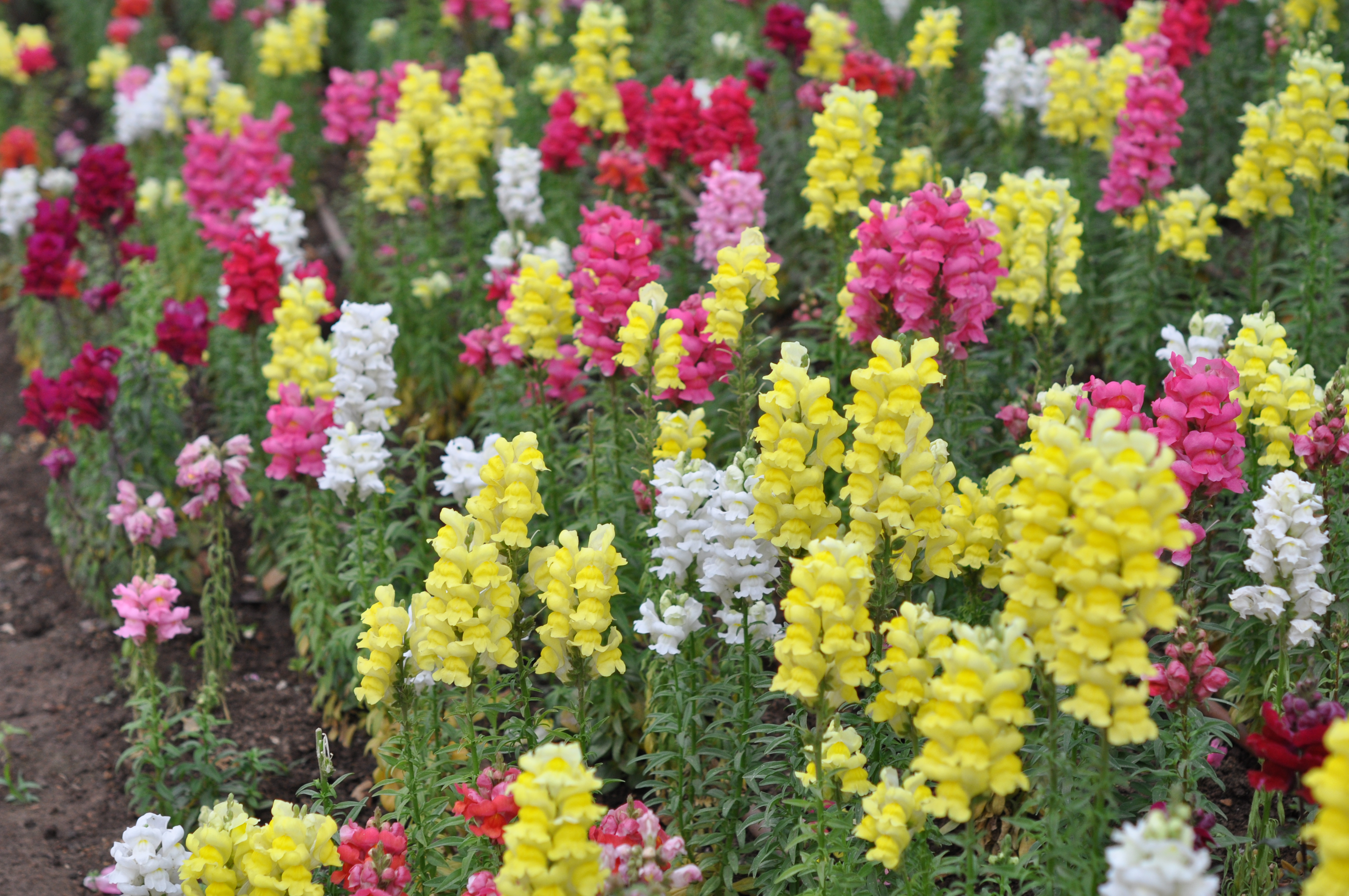
A field of common snapdragons (Antirrhinum majus) grown in Jerusalem

Most Antirrhineae are herbaceous, short-lived, perennial or annual plants growing at most about a metre/yard tall when in full flower; the maximum height of most species is half as much or less. Some are prostrate or twining. The flowers are often conspicuous, tubular with a basal appendix (spur, gibbous, or saccate) containing nectaries, and may be of any color, though yellow and blue/purple hues are most common. Multicolored flowers are a common occurrence in this tribe; a typical pattern is one conspicuous whitish or bright yellow or reddish spot at the lower outer edge of the flower tube, looking like a protruding tongue. Other characters include poricidal dehiscent capsule fruit, and the possession of iridoid glycosides.

The Antirrhineae are not noted as food- or fodder plants, probably due to the iridoid content making them less than palatable. However, the tribe does not seem to contain highly poisonous plants, either; rather, use in folk medicine has been documented for a few species. While e.g. common toadflax (Linaria vulgaris) is credited with a range of uses by European herbalists, as of the 2010s, little scientific study has been made and the traditionally attested medical properties of the Antirrhineae are by and large unremarkable by standards of the Plantaginaceae, which abound with species of major pharmacological interest. The chief human use of the present tribe is for the flowers, primarily as ornamental plants in gardening. Colloquially called "the snapdragon", Antirrhinum majus is probably the single most widely known member of the Antirrhineae by far.

Antirrhinum majus cultivars can today be encountered essentially anywhere between Earth's polar circles, whether grown in a range of sizes and colours by hobbyists or field-scale for sale as cut flowers. In the hottest parts of the globe, it dies after one flowering, and in arid regions, other species may be more important, but otherwise it is extremely adaptable, and in warm-temperate climates, individual plants may survive for several years. The readiness with which A. majus flower colour and shape mutate and can be crossbred has led to the establishments of unusual (e.g. peloric) cultivars, as well as to making this species one of the first model organisms of genetics and helping uniting the theories of Darwin and Mendel. It remains a key model organism today in fields such as plant developmental genetics. Common toadflax has become established as a model organism more recently; while it may be an invasive nuisance weed in agriculture, like other toadflaxes and snapdragons, its attractive flowers make it useful as a wildflower. At present however, the other members of this family are generally only of minor or localized interest.

== Taxonomy ==
The Antirrhineae include about 30 genera with roughly 320 species, of which 150 are in genus Linaria. The type genus is Antirrhinum L.

Antirrhineae are probably most closely related to the turtlehead tribe (Cheloneae) and/or a large and badly resolved core group of their family including plants as diverse as water-starworts (Callitriche), foxgloves (Digitalis), and speedwell (Veronica).

=== Subdivision ===
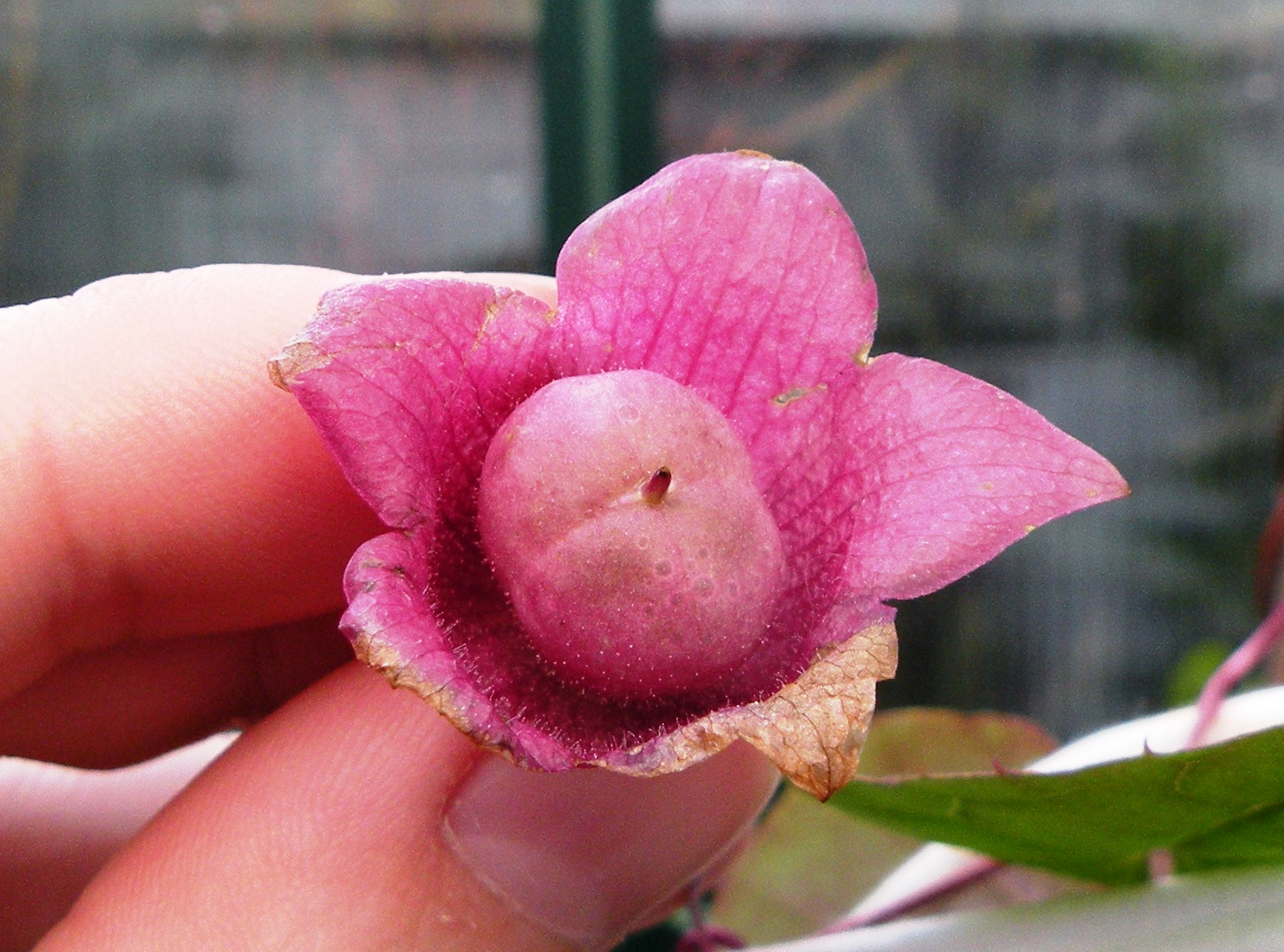
Developing capsule fruit in the unusual calyx of Rhodochiton atrosanguineus

As the Antirrhineae have long been considered a distinct group, there has also been a long debate about recognition of distinct subdivisions. In 1909, Rouy separated the snapdragon-like subtribe Linarieae from the open-mouthed Anarrhineae and the monotypic Rhodochitoneae, the latter due to their petal-like calyx. By the mid-20th century, Rothmaler on morphological grounds identified five subtribes containing 21 genera:

- Anarrhinum group / Anarrhinae / Simbuletinae (monotypic)
- Gambelia group / Gambeliinae (3 genera)
- Linaria group / Linariinae (11 genera)
- Maurandya group / Maurandyinae (5 genera) – including Rhodochitoneae
- Mohavea group / Mohaveinae (monotypic)

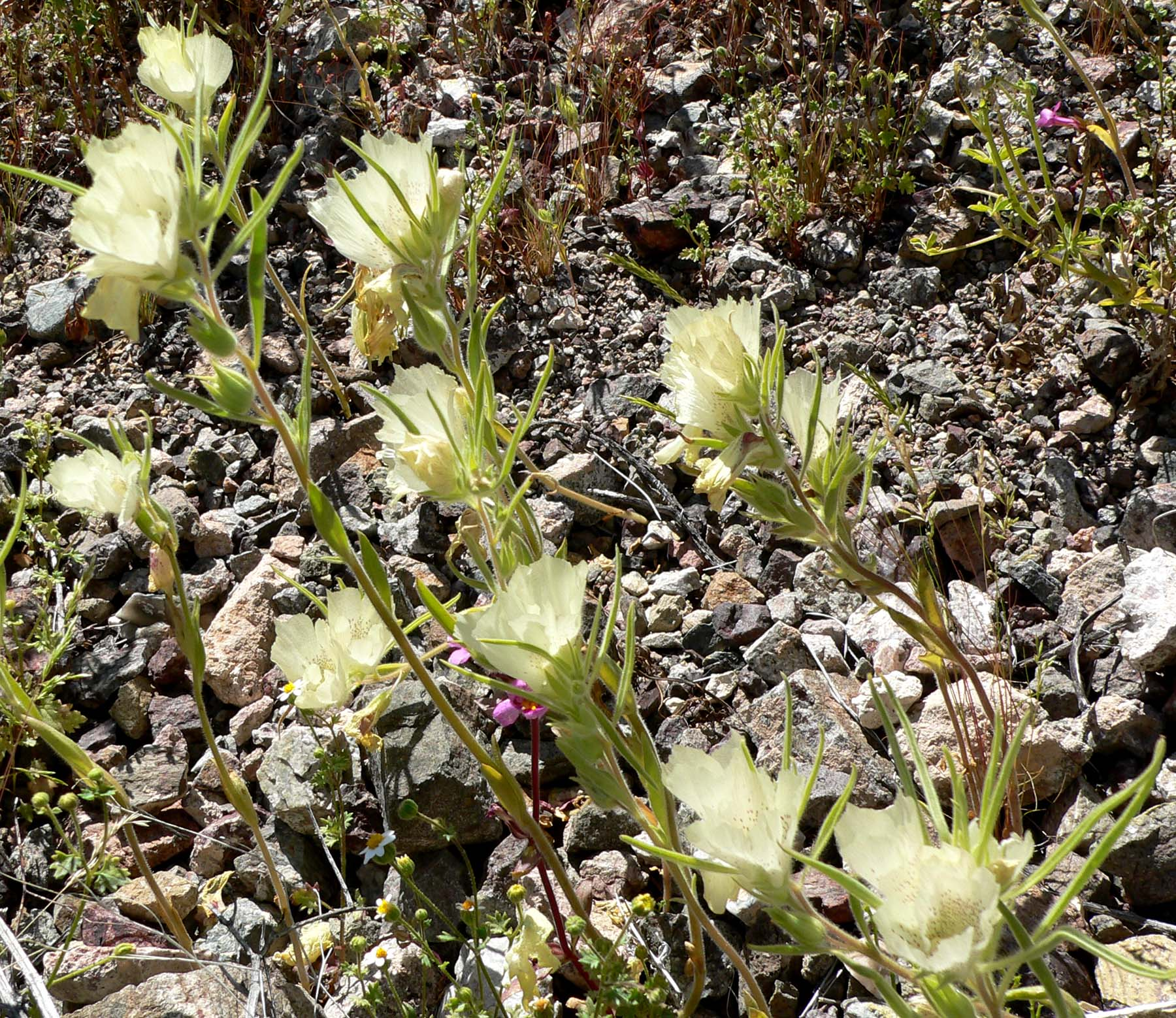
Mohavea confertiflora mimics the entirely unrelated asterid Mentzelia involucrata, misleading its pollinator Xeralictus beetles, as well as botanists researching Antirrhineae systematics

Some 21st-century phylogenetic analyses indicate some quite different lineages. Mainly, the earlier authors seem to have overlumped the snapdragon-like forms (including toadflaxes) which actually do not seem to be closely related, while overemphasizing the morphological diversity of the true snapdragon relatives. As early as 1982, Speta had realized that the typical toadflaxes (including Nuttallanthus) were a lineage well apart from the snapdragons and similar genera, and established the Antirrhininae for the latter. In 2000, combining internal transcribed spacer (ITS) and morphological data from 16 genera, Ghebrehiwet et al confirmed Rothmaler's proposal of a close relationship between the fairly dissimilar-looking Maurandya and Rhodochiton and the distinctness of their lineage from the bulk of the subfamily. However, they found the "Linarieae" hard to resolve, but could already tell that Kickxia should be moved to the Anarrhinae, and Asarina and Cymbalaria to the Maurandyinae. In addition, Mohavea was recognized as a snapdragon relative with extremely modified flowers, refuting a monotypic Mohaveinae. Vargas et al in 2004 found six probable clades based on ITS and ndhF sequences of 22 genera, which they labelled as:

- Anarrhinum group (2 genera)
- Antirrhinum group (at least 7 genera)
- Chaenorhinum group (3 genera)
- Gambelia group (at least 3 genera)
- Linaria group (1 or 2 genera)
- Maurandya group (at least 6 genera)

However, they also noted profound morphological diversity amongst the Antirrhinum group, in accordance with the proliferation of segregated genera.

Using ITS data from all 29 then-recognized genera, the 2013 study of Fernández-Mazuecos et al. identified six similar clades. They were able to assign all these genera to one of these clades, which they labelled as:

- Anarrhinum clade (2 genera)
- Antirrhinum clade (9 genera)
- Chaenorhinum clade (3 genera)
- Cymbalaria clade (9 genera)
- Galvezia clade (3 genera)
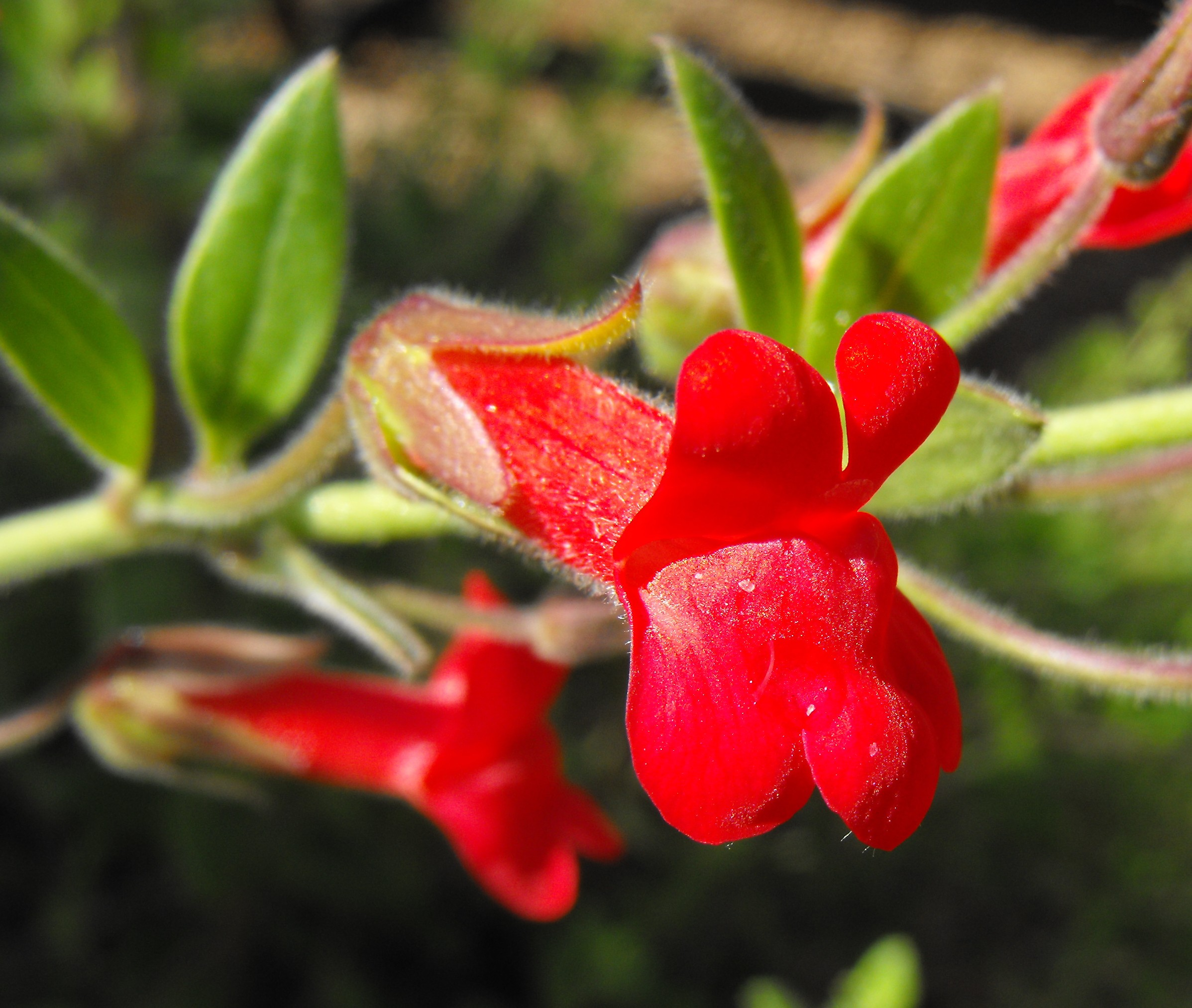
  Ornamental cultivar 'Firecracker' of the disputed showy island snapdragon (Gambelia/Galvezia speciosa)
- Linaria clade (2 genera)

The most striking difference between the 2004 and 2013 results is the precisely inverted placement of Galvezia and Gambelia (one as core of a distinct clade, the other close to Antirrhinum as part of the Sairocarpus complex). Given the highly similar datasets and analyses, a clerical error confusing the two generic names might be suspected, but considering that the 2013 study included two species of each genus which congruently resolved as sister taxa, hybrid introgression, or a disparity between nuclear (ITS) and chloroplast (ndhF) evolution or some other divergence seems a more likely cause. The erratic behavior of the two genera was noted by Vargas et al but not discussed in Fernández-Mazuecos et al.; adding to the confusion, Ghebrehiwet et al found a strongly supported Galvezia fruticosa-Gambelia speciosa clade excluding Pseudorontium and Schweinfurthia and equidistant from the true snapdragons and toadflaxes, entirely in line with Rothmaler's Gambeliinae. Furthermore, several species were historically moved between the two genera without authors noting anything suggesting against a very close relationship between them.

Regarding internal phylogeny, at present, resolution is insufficient. In the more recent studies, the Chaenorhinum clade is fairly robustly resolved as sister to the true snapdragons, but otherwise not much is clear. Except for the Antirrhinum-Chaenorhinum and Linaria clades, all main lineages have resolved as basal in one recent study or another, but the proposed interrelationships between the clades/subtribes other than Antirrhinum-Chaenorhinum are at most tenuously supported in all of them. As it seems, however, Rothmaler's general concept of an ancestral radiation of basal lineages and a subsequent diversification of the toadflax-snapdragon group was essentially correct, even though he overlumped the latter.

=== Genera ===
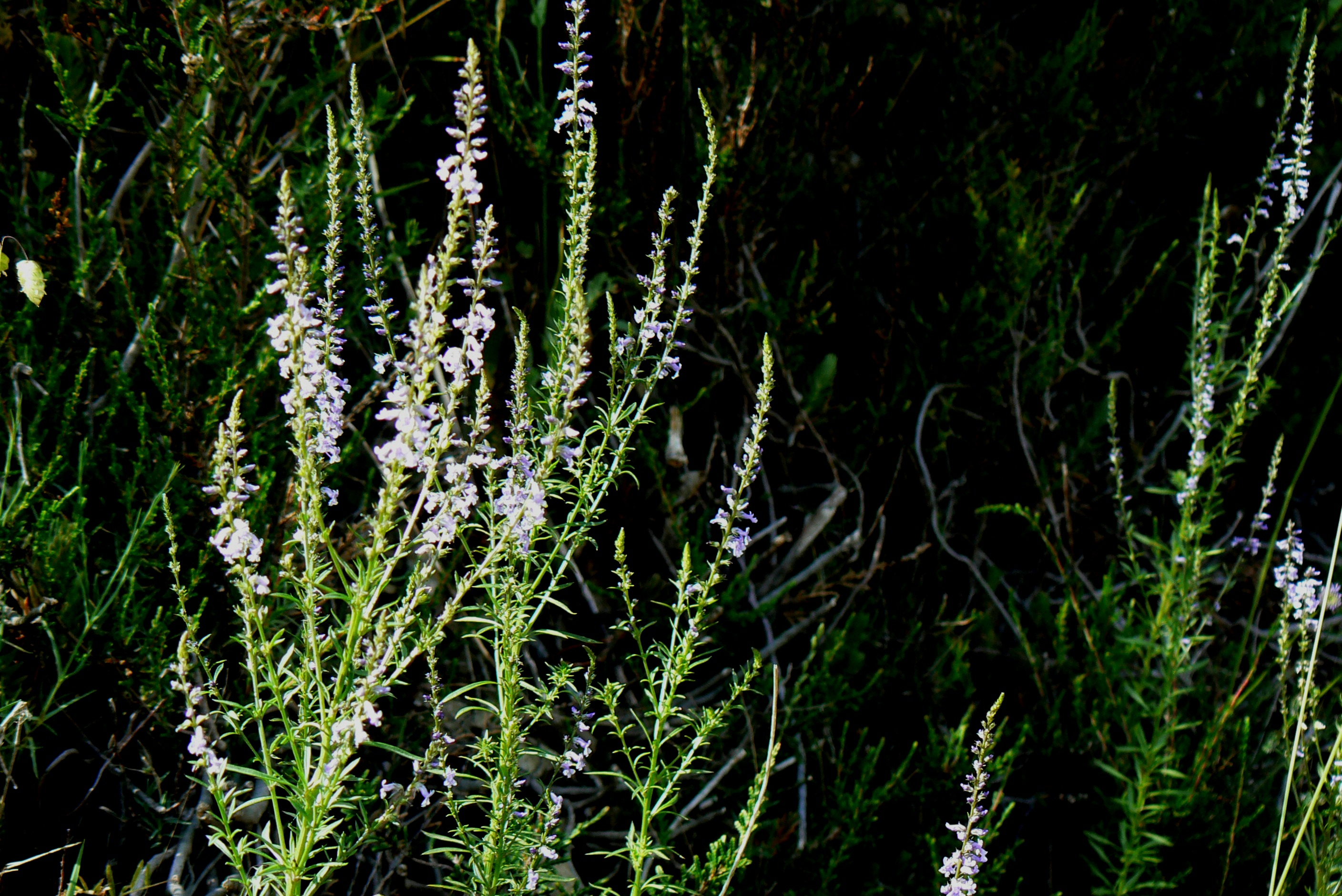
As recognized around 1900 already, the daisy-leaved toadflax (Anarrhinum bellidifolium) is not truly a toadflax

As of 2013, 29 genera are included in the Antirrhineae. Listed by clade, they are:

- Anarrhinum clade / Anarrhinae
  - Anarrhinum Desf.
  - Kickxia Dumort.
  - Nanorrhinum Betsche

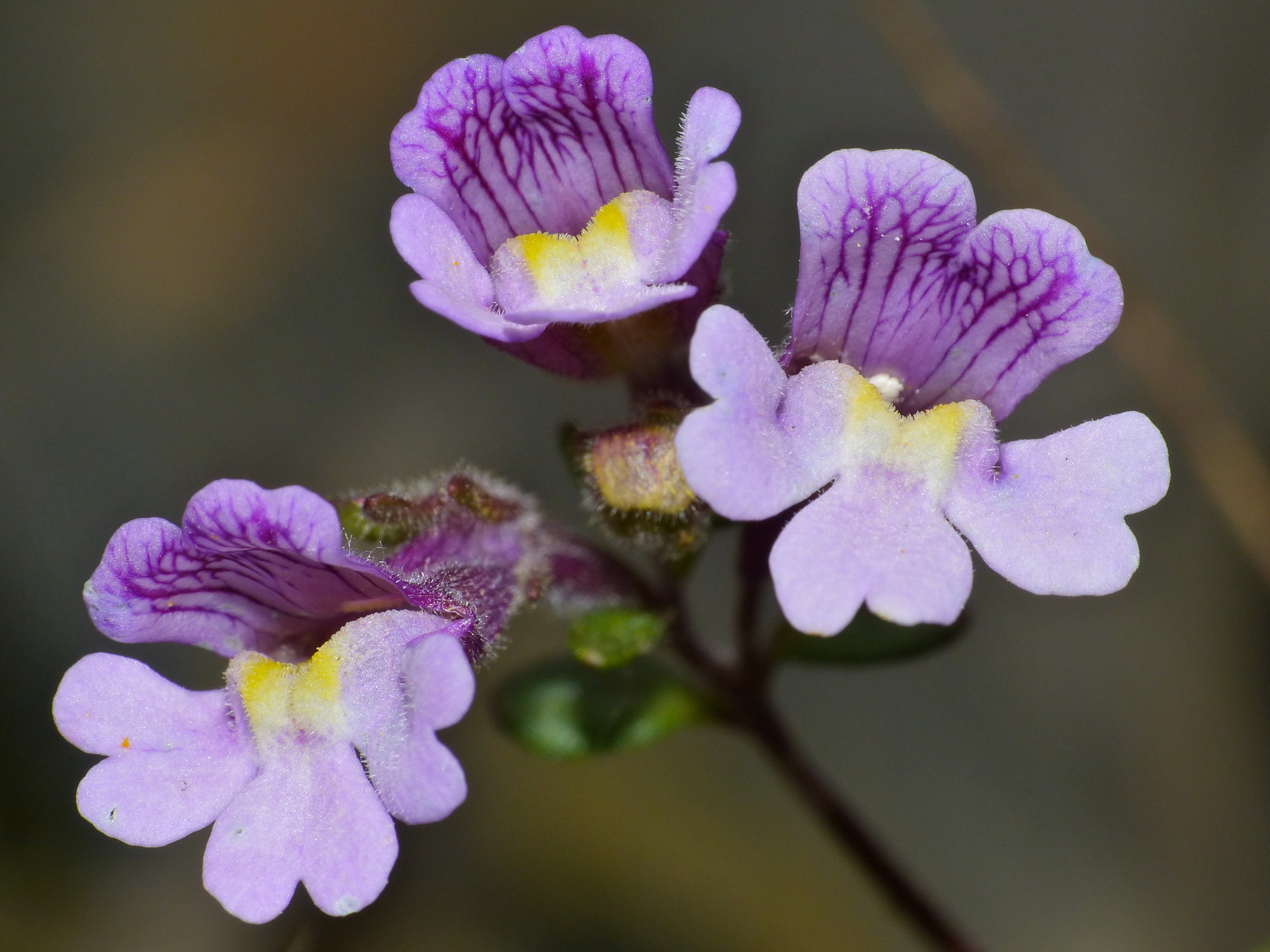
Fairy snapdragon (Chaenorhinum origanifolium)

- Antirrhinum clade / Mohaveinae (disputed) – most formerly in Linariinae
  - Acanthorrhinum Rothm.
  - Antirrhinum L.
  - Howelliella Rothm. – formerly often in Antirrhinum
  - Misopates Raf. – formerly often in Antirrhinum
  - Mohavea A.Gray – formerly often in Antirrhinum
  - Neogaerrhinum Rothm. – formerly often in Antirrhinum
  - Pseudomisopates Güemes
  - Sairocarpus D.A.Sutton – formerly often in Antirrhinum
- Chaenorhinum clade – newly recognized, formerly in Linariinae
  - Albraunia Speta
  - Chaenorhinum (DC.) Rchb.
  - Holzneria Speta

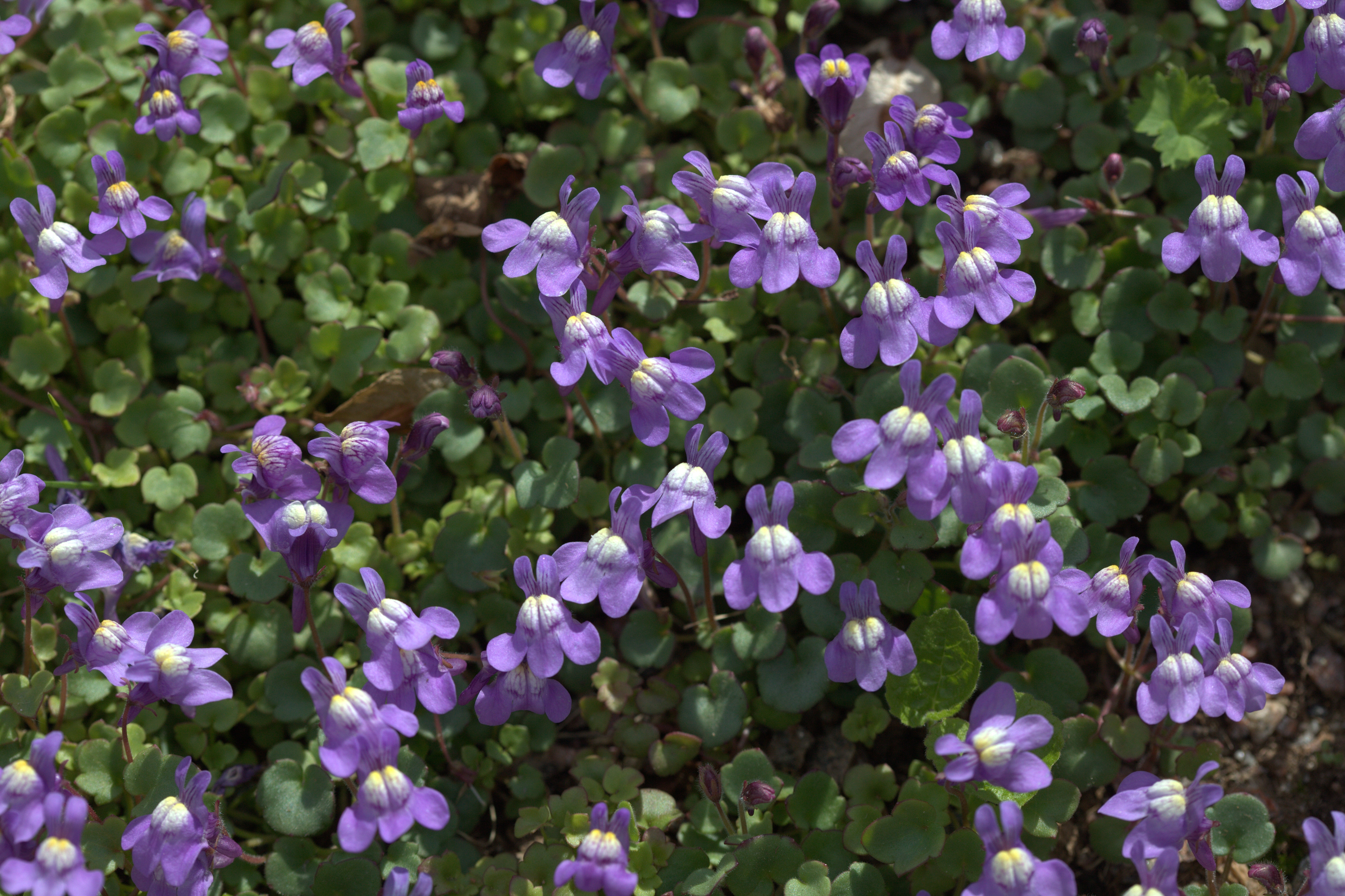
Cymbalaria pallida

- Cymbalaria clade / Maurandyinae
  - Asarina Mill.
  - Cymbalaria Hill
  - Holmgrenanthe Elisens – formerly in Maurandya
  - Lophospermum D.Don – formerly in Maurandya
  - Mabrya Elisens
  - Maurandya Ortega – including Epixiphium (Engelm. ex A.Gray) Munz and Maurandella (A. Gray) Rothm.
  - Rhodochiton Zucc. ex Otto & A. Dietr.
- Galvezia clade or Gambeliinae (disputed)
  - Galvezia Dombey ex Juss. (tentatively placed here)
  - Gambelia Nutt. (tentatively placed here)
  - Pseudorontium (A.Gray) Rothm. – formerly often in Antirrhinum
  - Schweinfurthia A.Braun

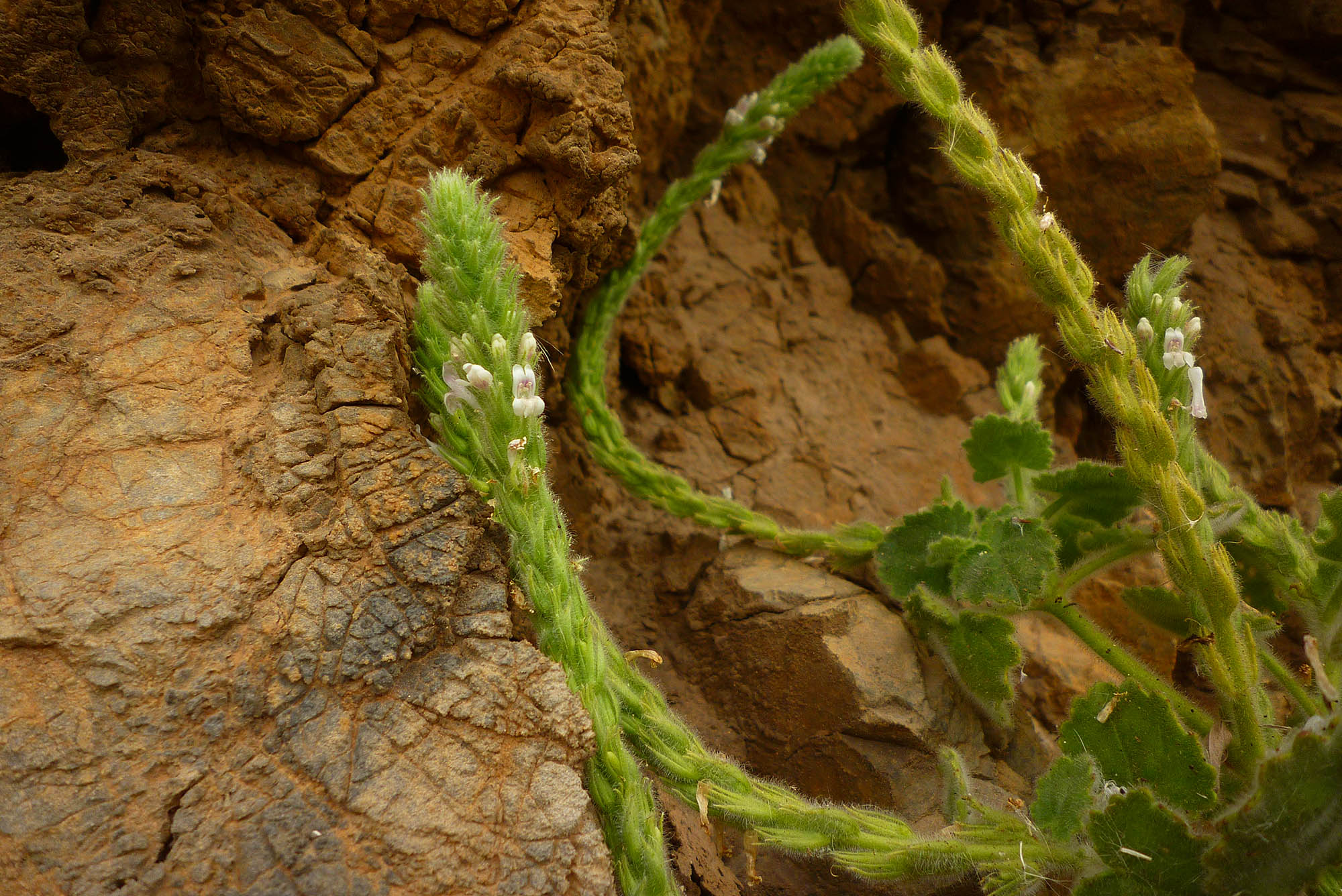
The enigmatic Lafuentea rotundifolia flowering near the Castillo de San Julián in Spain

- Linaria clade / Linariinae sensu stricto
  - Linaria Mill.
  - Nuttallanthus D.A.Sutton – formerly often in Linaria

Lafuentea Lag. is a highly distinct Plantaginaceae genus containing a mere two species from the Strait of Gibraltar region. It is included in the present tribe by GRIN, whereas other authors have variously allied it with the foxgloves (Digitalis) or even united with the equally puzzling Oreosolen and Ourisia in a lineage close to the broomrape Rehmannia as part of the Scrophulariaceae sensu lato. In the 2013 study as well as in the 2005 Plantaginaceae analysis by Albach et al. Lafuentea indeed tends to resolve as an additional and basalmost lineage (subtribe in Linnean taxonomy) of the Antirrhineae, far from Digitalis, Oreosolen, Ourisia or Rehmannia; in fact, these five genera are apparently all distinct from each other at least at tribal level (Oreosolen and Rehmannia are even outside the Plantaginaceae). However, the results were not unequivocal and support for including Lafuentea in the Antirrhineae not very robust. Besides, the interrelationships of the Plantaginaceae tribes are also not at all robustly resolved, and some fairly close relatives of the Antirrhineae – such as Campylanthus or the singular Hemiphragma – have similarly uncertain positions as Lafuentea with regard to their presumed closest relatives. Thus, while Lafuentea seems to be a "living fossil" from near the origin of the Antirrhineae and is certainly highly useful as an outgroup in cladistic studies of their internal relations, whether its placement within this tribe is correct requires further study.
