= Anarrhinum longipedicellatum =

Conservation status
- Near Threatened (IUCN 3.1)

Scientific classification
- Kingdom: Plantae
- Clade: Tracheophytes
- Clade: Angiosperms
- Clade: Eudicots
- Clade: Asterids
- Order: Lamiales
- Family: Plantaginaceae
- Genus: Anarrhinum
- Species: A. longipedicellatum

Binomial name
- Anarrhinum longipedicellatum R. Fern.

Species of flowering plant

Anarrhinum longipedicellatum is a species of flowering plant in the toadflax tribe Antirrhineae, endemic to central Portugal. It inhabits rocky areas and embankments, in dry and exposed sites, on acidic substrates.
