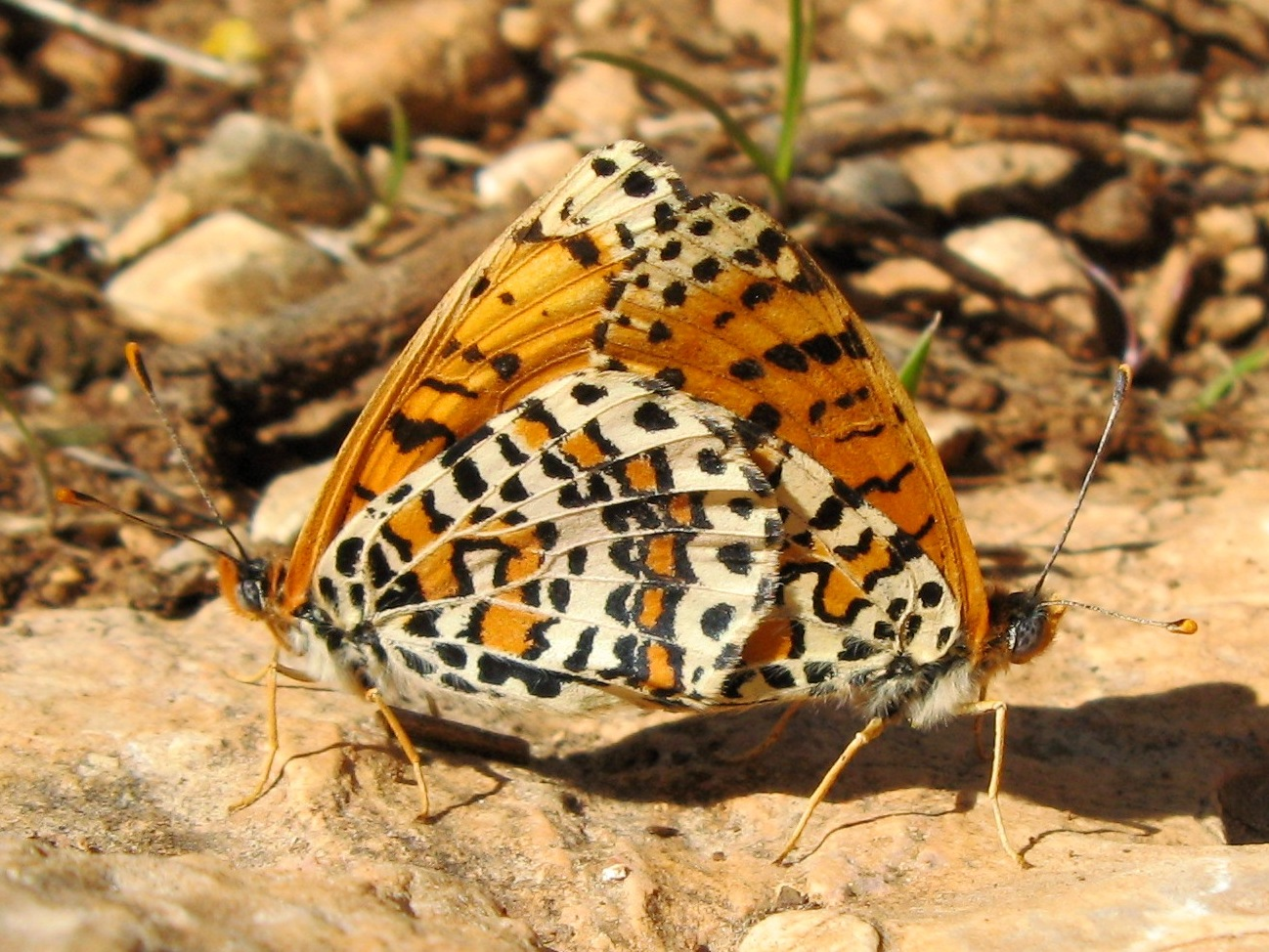

Scientific classification
- Domain: Eukaryota
- Kingdom: Animalia
- Phylum: Arthropoda
- Class: Insecta
- Order: Lepidoptera
- Family: Nymphalidae
- Genus: Melitaea
- Species: M. deserticola

Binomial name
- Melitaea deserticola Oberthür, 1909

Synonyms
- Melitaea ab. deserticola Oberthür, 1876; Melitaea didyma harterti Rothschild, 1913; Melitaea didyma harterti ab. pseudoacraeina Rothschild, 1917; Melitaea didyma harterti ab. nigrofasciata Rothschild, 1917; Melitaea abyssinica scotti Higgins, 1941

= Melitaea deserticola =

Species of butterfly

Melitaea deserticola, the desert fritillary, is a butterfly of the family Nymphalidae. It is found in North Africa (Morocco, Algeria, Libya and Egypt), Lebanon, Israel, Jordan, Saudi Arabia and Yemen.

The larvae feed on Linaria aegyptiaca, Plantago media, Anarrhinum fruticosum and Anarrhinum species.

== Subspecies ==
- Melitaea deserticola deserticola (North Africa)
- Melitaea deserticola macromaculata Belter, 1934 (Syria, Lebanon, Israel, Jordan, western Saudi Arabia)
- Melitaea deserticola scotti Higgins, 1941 (Yemen, Oman)

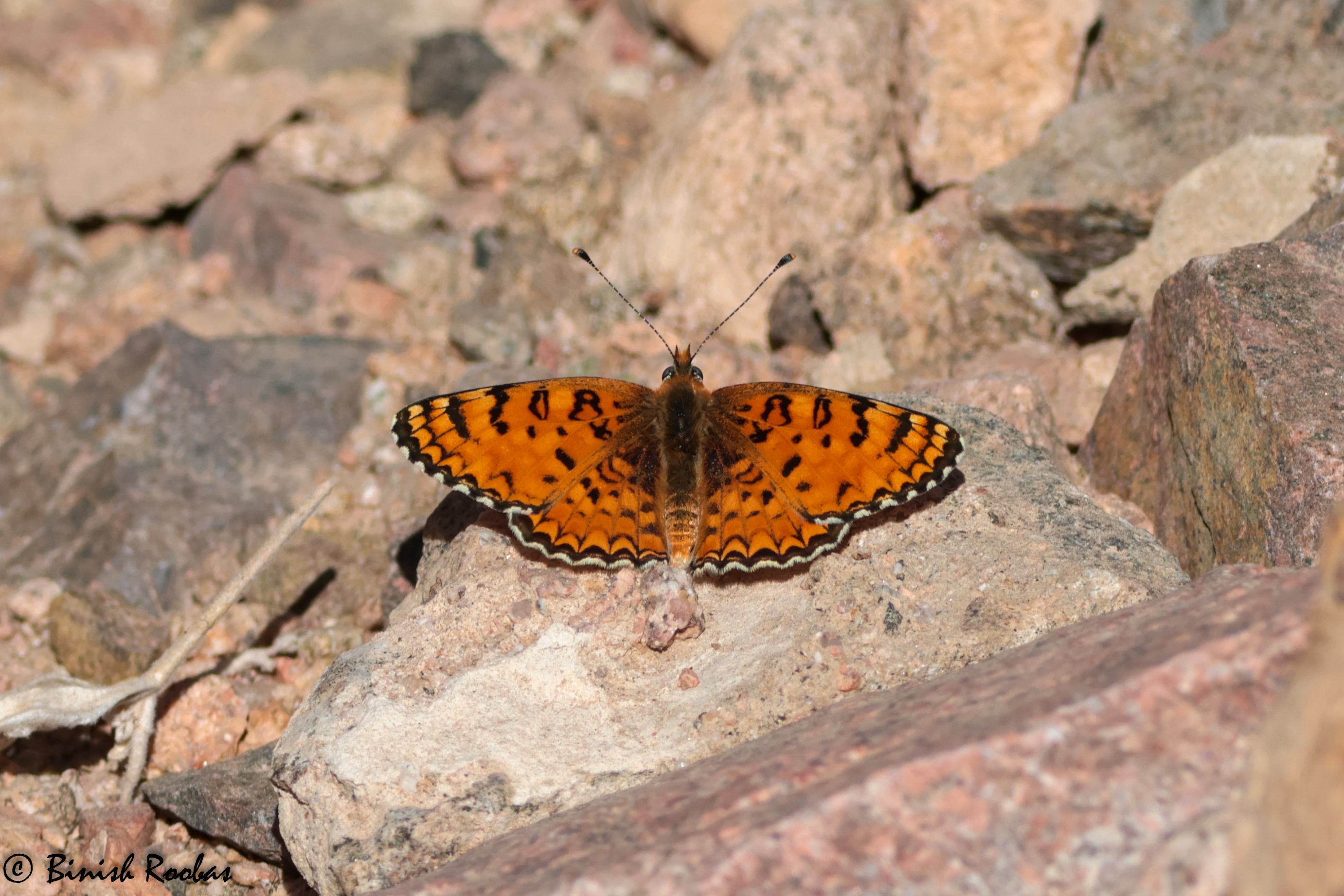
Melitaea deserticola from Saudi Arabia
