= Schweinfurthia =

Schweinfurthia may refer to:

- Schweinfurthia (beetle), a genus of beetles in the family Tenebrionidae
- Schweinfurthia (plant), a genus of plants in the family Plantaginaceae
