= Cyperus holostigma =

Scientific classification
- Kingdom: Plantae
- Clade: Tracheophytes
- Clade: Angiosperms
- Clade: Monocots
- Clade: Commelinids
- Order: Poales
- Family: Cyperaceae
- Genus: Cyperus
- Species: C. holostigma

Binomial name
- Cyperus holostigma C.B.Clarke ex Schweinf., 1894

Species of sedge

Cyperus holostigma is a species of sedge that is native to parts of eastern Africa.

== See also ==
- List of Cyperus species
