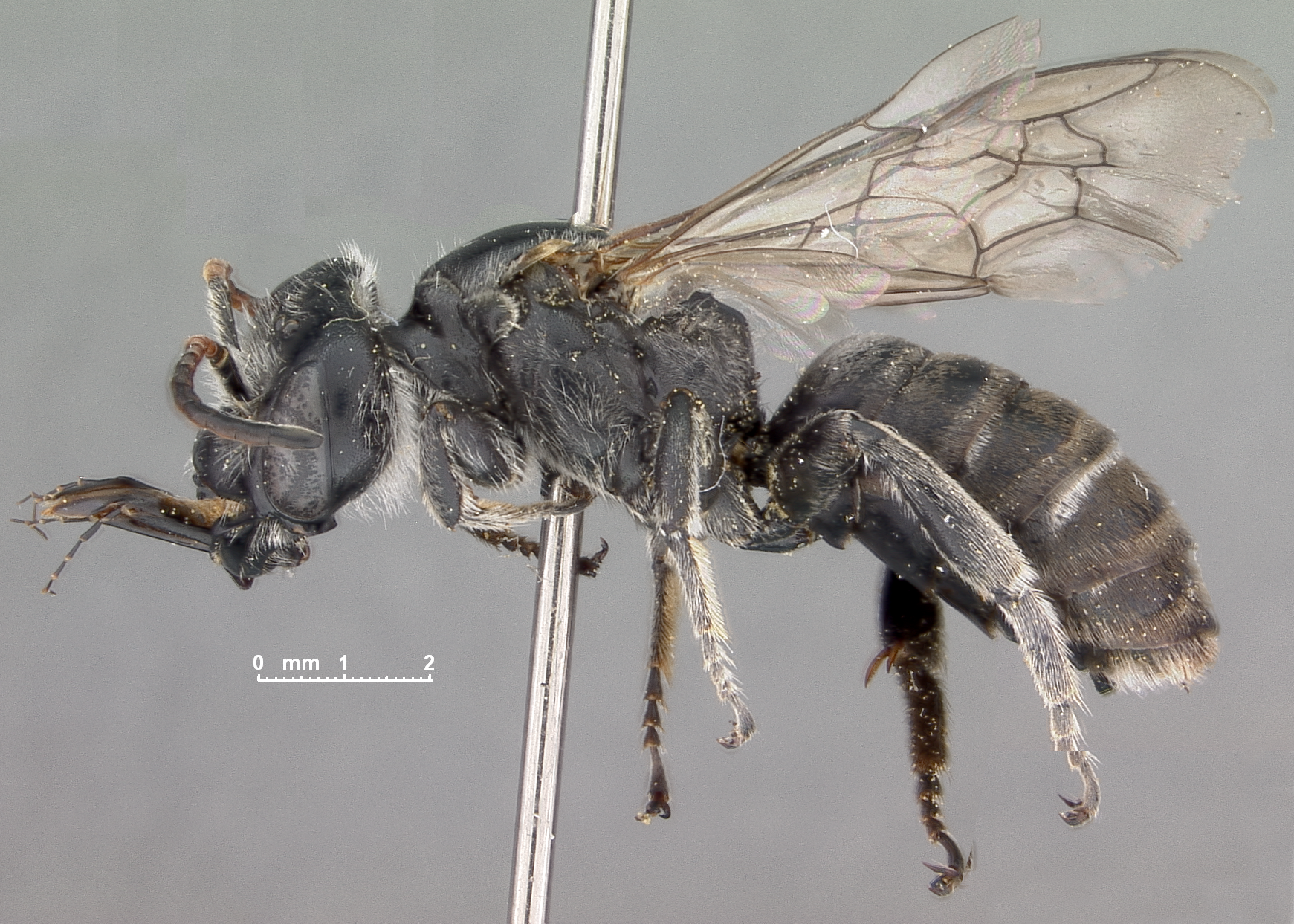

Scientific classification
- Kingdom: Animalia
- Phylum: Arthropoda
- Class: Insecta
- Order: Hymenoptera
- Family: Halictidae
- Genus: Xeralictus
- Species: X. timberlakei

Binomial name
- Xeralictus timberlakei Cockerell, 1927

= Xeralictus timberlakei =

Species of bee

Xeralictus timberlakei is a species of sweat bee in the family Halictidae. It is found in North America.
