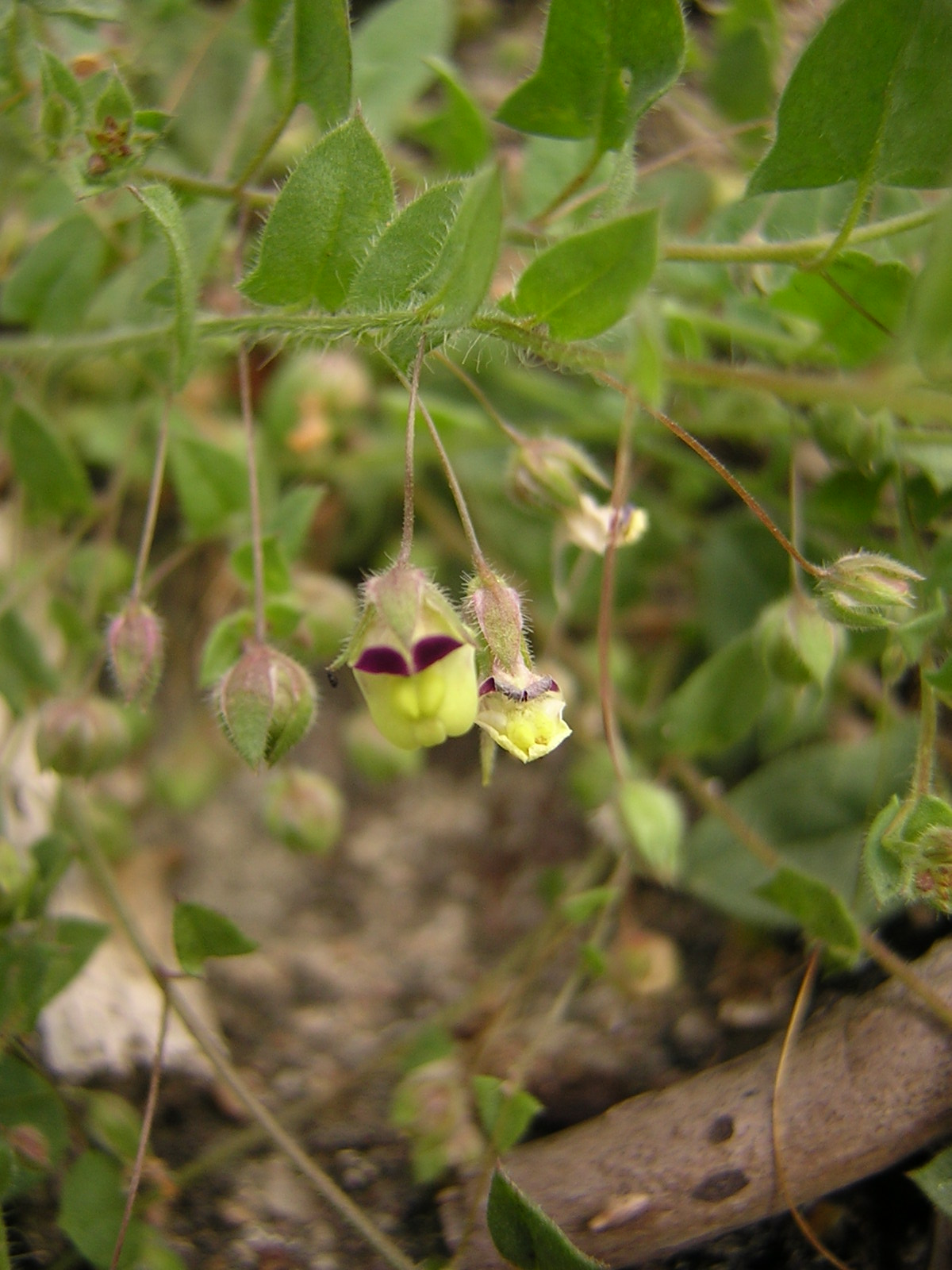

Scientific classification
- Kingdom: Plantae
- Clade: Tracheophytes
- Clade: Angiosperms
- Clade: Eudicots
- Clade: Asterids
- Order: Lamiales
- Family: Plantaginaceae
- Genus: Kickxia
- Species: K. elatine

Binomial name
- Kickxia elatine (L.) Dumort.

Synonyms
- Antirrhinum elatine

= Kickxia elatine =

Species of flowering plant

Kickxia elatine (commonly known as sharpleaf cancerwort and sharp-leaved fluellen) is a species of flowering plant in the family Plantaginaceae. It is native to Europe and Asia, but it is present on other continents as an introduced species, and sometimes a noxious weed.

== Description ==
This is a small hairy herb with a trailing stem with many branches. It produces oval to arrowhead-shaped fuzzy leaves at wide intervals along the slender stem, and solitary snapdragon-like spurred flowers borne on long, straight pedicels. Each flower is up to 1.5 centimeters long with a narrow, pointed spur extending from the back. The lobes of the mouth are yellow, white, and purple, and the whole flower is fuzzy to hairy, except for the flower stalk, which is more or less bare, in contrast to Kickxia spuria which has a hairy flower stalk. The fruit is a spherical capsule about 4 millimeters long.
