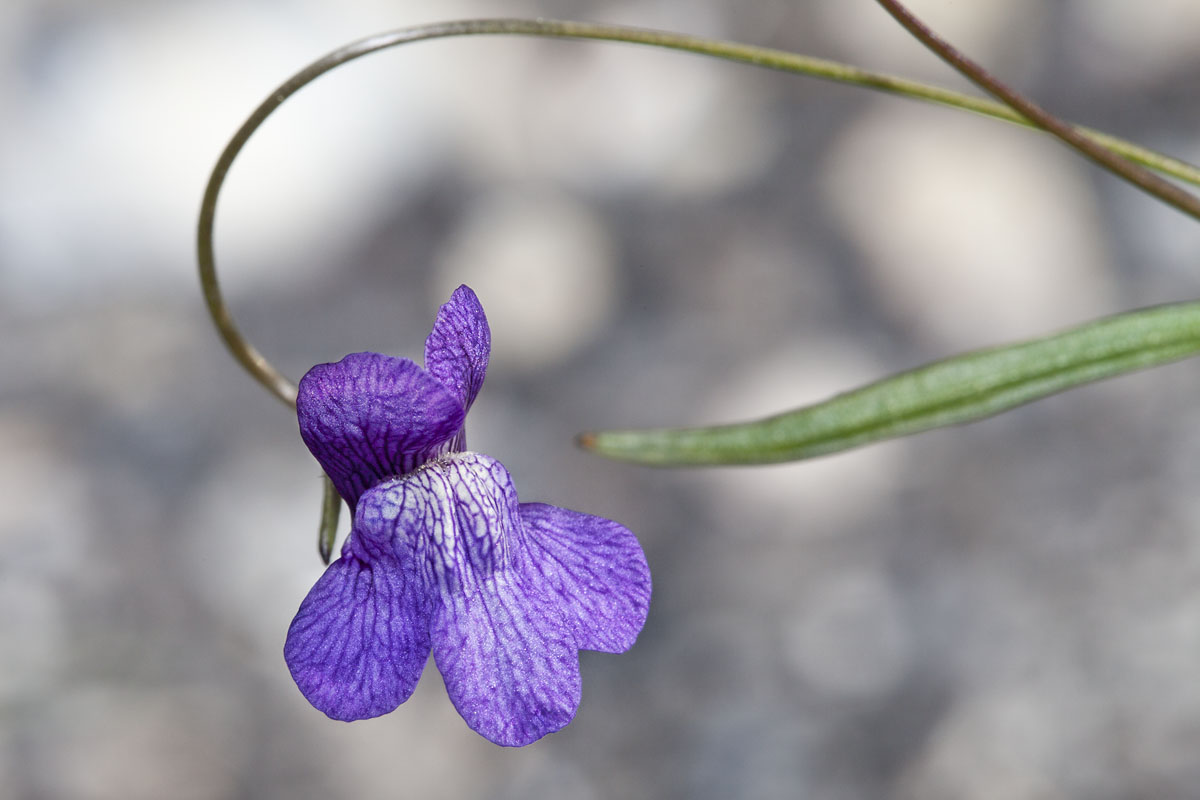

Scientific classification
- Kingdom: Plantae
- Clade: Tracheophytes
- Clade: Angiosperms
- Clade: Eudicots
- Clade: Asterids
- Order: Lamiales
- Family: Plantaginaceae
- Genus: Neogaerrhinum
- Species: N. strictum

Binomial name
- Neogaerrhinum strictum (Hook. & Arn.) Rothm.

Synonyms
- Antirrhinum hookerianum Millsp.; Antirrhinum kelloggii Greene; Antirrhinum strictum (Hook. & Arn.) A.Gray, nom. illeg.; Asarina stricta (Hook. & Arn.) Pennell; Maurandya stricta Hook. & Arn.; Neogaerrhinum kelloggii (Greene) Thieret

= Neogaerrhinum strictum =

Species of flowering plant

Neogaerrhinum strictum, synonyms including Antirrhinum kelloggii and Neogaerrhinum kelloggii, is a species of flowering plant in the family Plantaginaceae. It is known by the common name Kellogg's snapdragon.

== Description ==
This is a thin, sprawling annual herb which sometimes becomes vine-like, climbing nearby objects or other plants. The inflorescence consists of a solitary flower on a very long, strongly coiling pedicel up to 9 centimeters long. The flower at the tip is a dark-veined purple snapdragon over a centimeter wide. The fruit is a dehiscent capsule containing many bumpy seeds.

== Distribution and habitat ==
Neogaerrhinum strictum is native to California and northwestern Mexico. It is found in the coastal hills and mountain ranges. It grows in many local plant communities, especially in areas that have recently burned.
