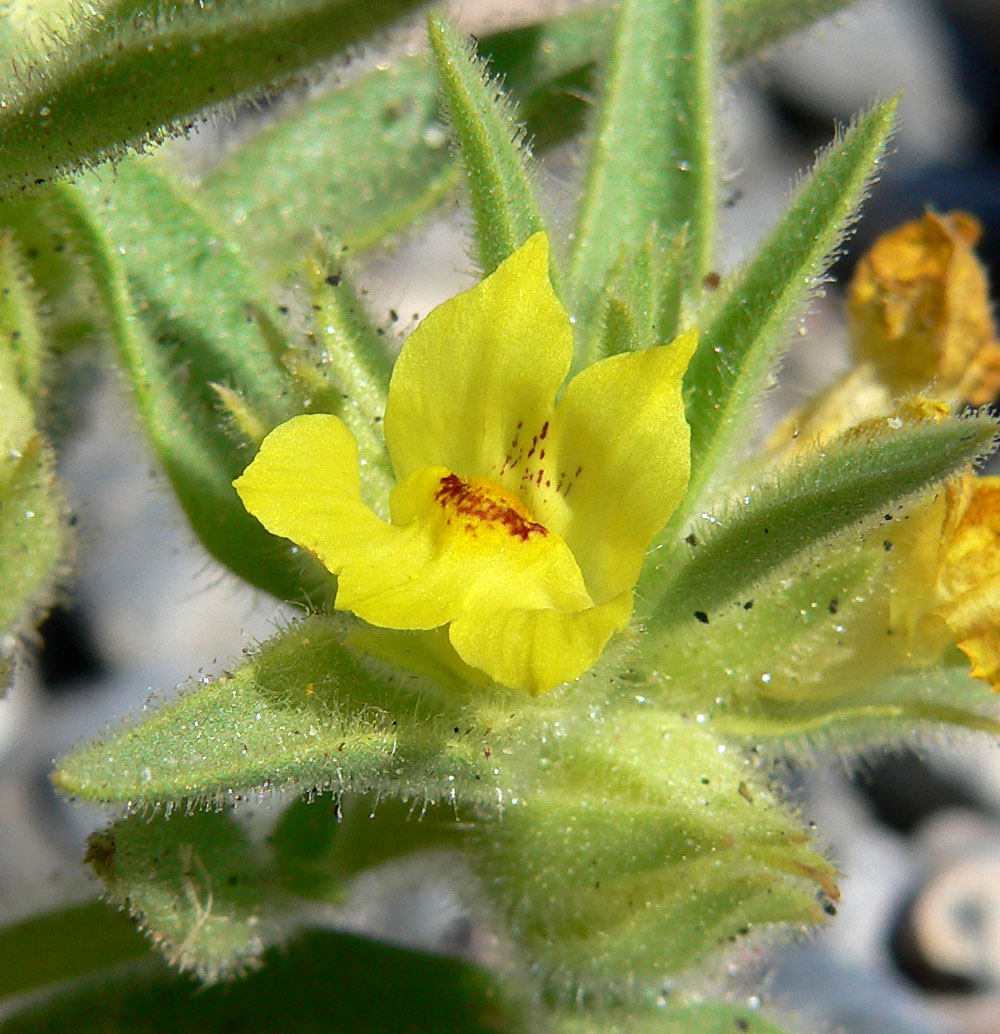

Scientific classification
- Kingdom: Plantae
- Clade: Tracheophytes
- Clade: Angiosperms
- Clade: Eudicots
- Clade: Asterids
- Order: Lamiales
- Family: Plantaginaceae
- Genus: Mohavea
- Species: M. breviflora

Binomial name
- Mohavea breviflora Coville

= Mohavea breviflora =

Species of flowering plant

Mohavea breviflora is a species of flowering plant in the plantain family known by the common names golden desert-snapdragon and lesser mohavea. It is native to the southwestern United States, including the Mojave Desert and surrounding areas.

== Description ==
It is a hairy annual herb growing erect to a maximum height near 20 centimeters. The alternately arranged leaves are lance-shaped. Flowers occur in the leaf axils. They are about 2 centimeters wide and divided into an upper lip with two lobes and a swollen lower lip with three. The flower is yellow with scattered red speckles.
