= Pseudorontium =

Scientific classification
- Kingdom: Plantae
- Clade: Embryophytes
- Clade: Tracheophytes
- Clade: Spermatophytes
- Clade: Angiosperms
- Clade: Eudicots
- Clade: Asterids
- Order: Lamiales
- Family: Plantaginaceae
- Tribe: Antirrhineae
- Genus: Pseudorontium (A. Gray) Rothm. (1943)
- Species: P. cyathiferum

Binomial name
- Pseudorontium cyathiferum (Benth.) Rothm. (1943)

Synonyms
- Antirrhinum cyathiferum Benth. (1844); Antirrhinum chytrospermum A.Gray (1877)

Genus of flowering plants

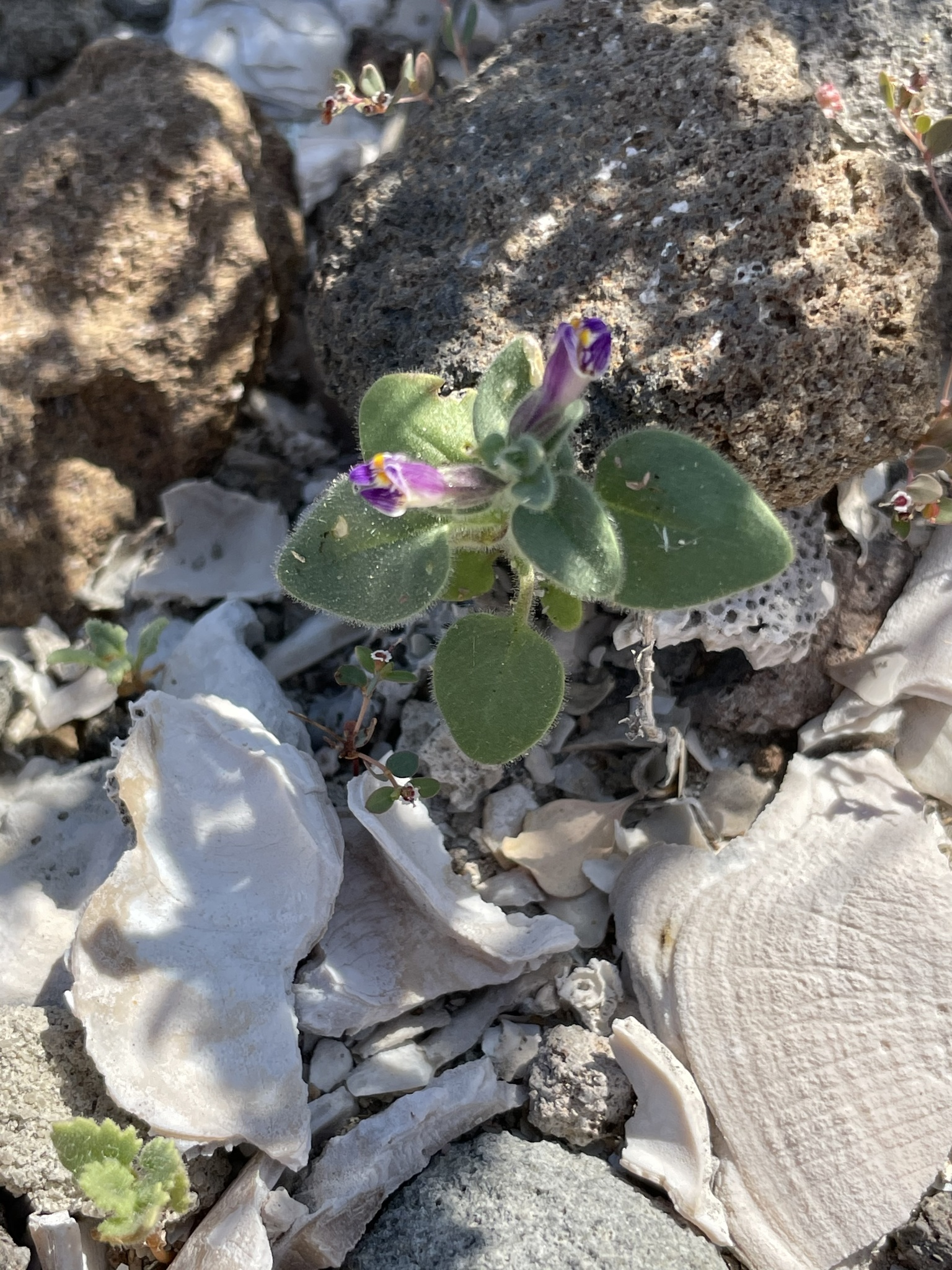
deep canyon snapdragon (Pseudorontium cyathiferum)

Pseudorontium is a genus of flowering plants with one species, Pseudorontium cyathiferum (syn. Antirrhinum cyathiferum), a New World snapdragon known by the common names dog's-mouth and Deep Canyon snapdragon. It is native to the deserts of northern Mexico and adjacent California and Arizona. It is an annual herb producing a hairy, erect, non-climbing stem with many oval-shaped leaves. The solitary flowers are dark-veined deep purple and white, often with some yellow in the throat, and are about a centimeter long. Previously considered to belong among the New World Antirrhinum species, it is now considered the sole member of the related genus Pseudorontium.
