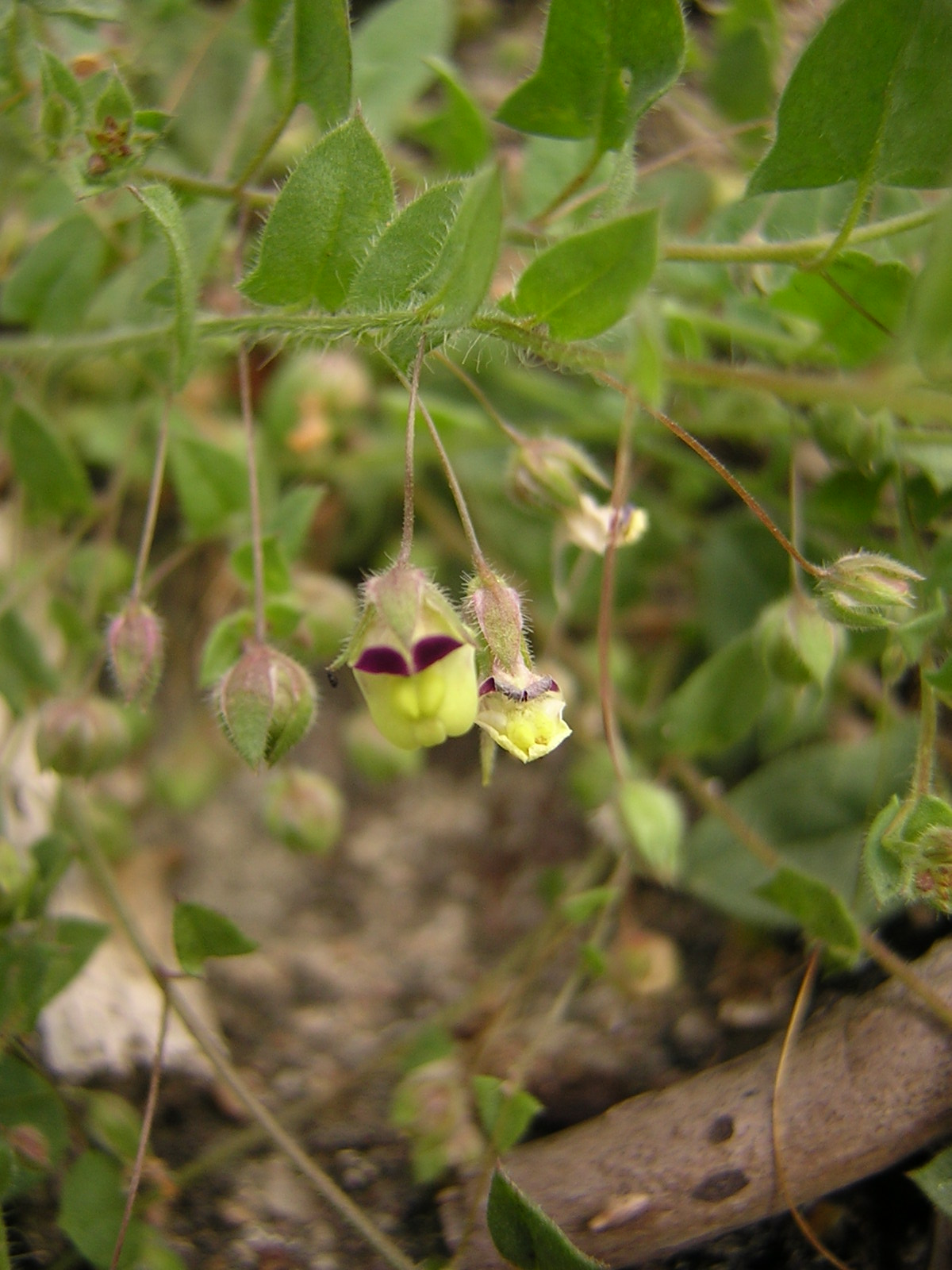
- Kickxia elatine

Scientific classification
- Kingdom: Plantae
- Clade: Embryophytes
- Clade: Tracheophytes
- Clade: Spermatophytes
- Clade: Angiosperms
- Clade: Eudicots
- Clade: Asterids
- Order: Lamiales
- Family: Plantaginaceae
- Tribe: Antirrhineae
- Genus: Kickxia; Dumort.

Species
- See text.

= Kickxia =

Genus of flowering plants

Kickxia is a genus of plants in the plantain family (Plantaginaceae). It includes several species known commonly as cancerworts or fluellins. Species are mostly native to Europe, Central Asia, and Africa, with two, K. elatine and K. spuria, well-established as invasive elsewhere.

== Taxonomy ==
The genus Kickxia was named after the Belgian botanist Jean Kickx. Some species formerly placed in this genus have been reassigned to Nanorrhinum.

=== Species ===
As of February 2018, Plants of the World Online accepted the following Kickxia species:

- Kickxia aegyptiaca (L.) Nábelek
- Kickxia caucasica (Muss.Puschk. ex Spreng.) Kuprian.
- Kickxia cirrhosa (L.) Fritsch
- Kickxia collenetteana D.A.Sutton
- Kickxia commutata (Bernh. ex Rchb.) Fritsch
- Kickxia × confinis (Lacroix) Soó
- Kickxia corallicola D.A.Sutton
- Kickxia dentata (Vahl) D.A.Sutton
- Kickxia elatine (L.) Dumort. - sharpleaf cancerwort
- Kickxia elatinoides (Desf.) Rothm.
- Kickxia floribunda (Boiss.) Täckh. & Boulos
- Kickxia glaberrima (J.A.Schmidt) D.A.Sutton
- Kickxia gombaultii (J.Thiébaut) Mouterde ex Charpin
- Kickxia hartlii (Betsche) D.Heller
- Kickxia lanigera (Desf.) Hand.-Mazz.
- Kickxia membranacea D.A.Sutton
- Kickxia papillosa R.R.Mill
- Kickxia pendula (G.Kunkel) G.Kunkel
- Kickxia petiolata D.A.Sutton
- Kickxia pseudoscoparia V.W.Sm. & D.A.Sutton
- Kickxia sabarum V.W.Sm. & D.A.Sutton
- Kickxia saccata D.A.Sutton
- Kickxia scalarum D.A.Sutton
- Kickxia spiniflora (O.Schwartz) D.A.Sutton
- Kickxia spuria (L.) Dumort. - roundleaf cancerwort

== See also ==
- Plants with common names that utilize Germanic suffix -wort
