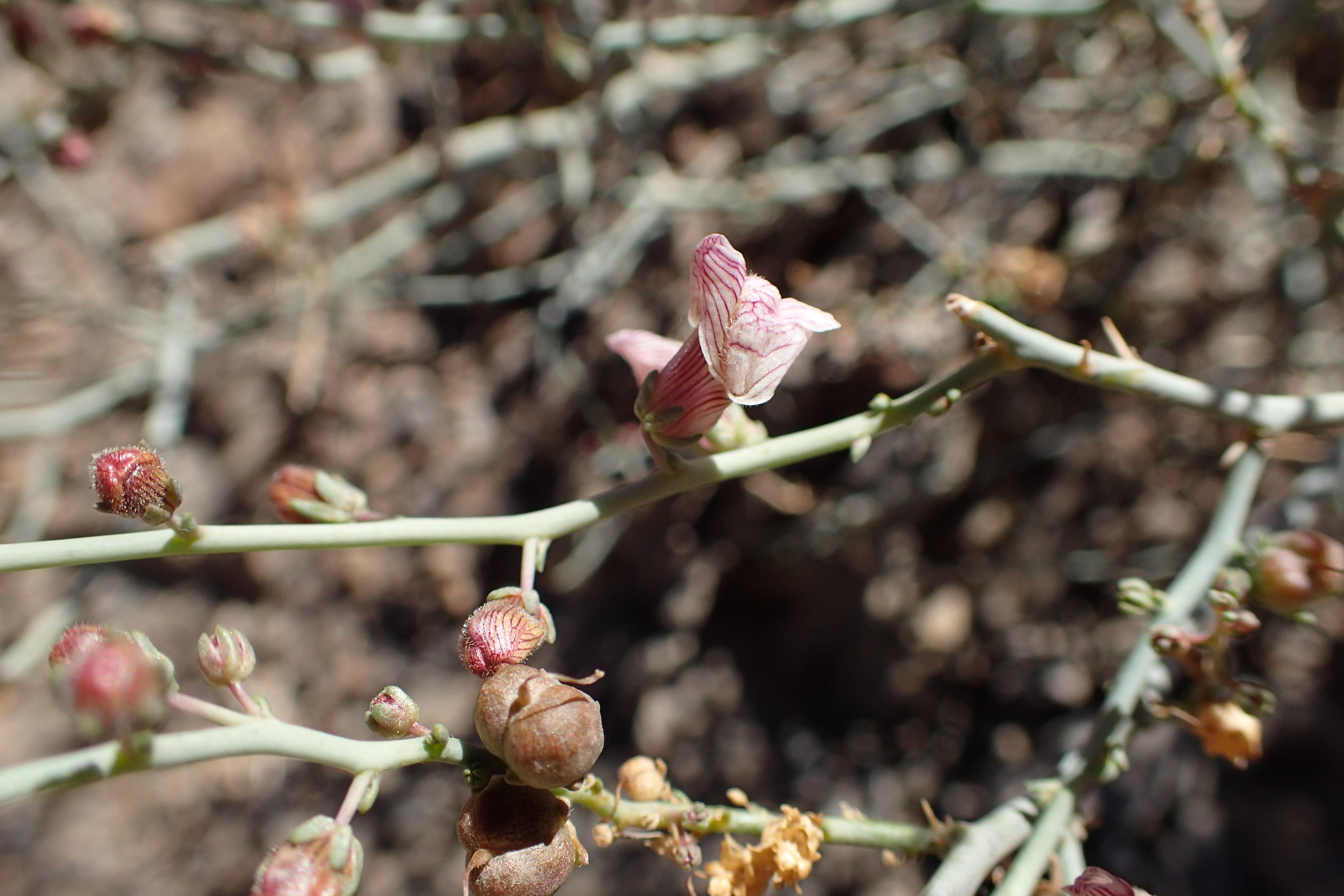

Scientific classification
- Kingdom: Plantae
- Clade: Embryophytes
- Clade: Tracheophytes
- Clade: Angiosperms
- Clade: Eudicots
- Clade: Asterids
- Order: Lamiales
- Family: Plantaginaceae
- Tribe: Antirrhineae
- Genus: Acanthorrhinum; Rothm.
- Species: A. ramosissimum

Binomial name
- Acanthorrhinum ramosissimum (Coss. & Durieu) Rothm.

Synonyms
- Homotypic Synonyms: Antirrhinum ramosissimum Coss. & Durieu; Heterotypic Synonyms: Antirrhinum flexuosum Pomel; Antirrhinum intricatum Ball; Antirrhinum ramosissimum var. flavum Maire; Antirrhinum ramosissimum var. flexuosum Coss. & Durieu; Antirrhinum ramosissimum subsp. intricatum Ball; Antirrhinum ramosissimum var. spinosissimum Batt.

= Acanthorrhinum =

Genus of flowering plants

Acanthorrhinum is a monotypic genus in the family Plantaginaceae that contains only the species Acanthorrhinum ramosissimum. It is found in Spain and North Africa.
