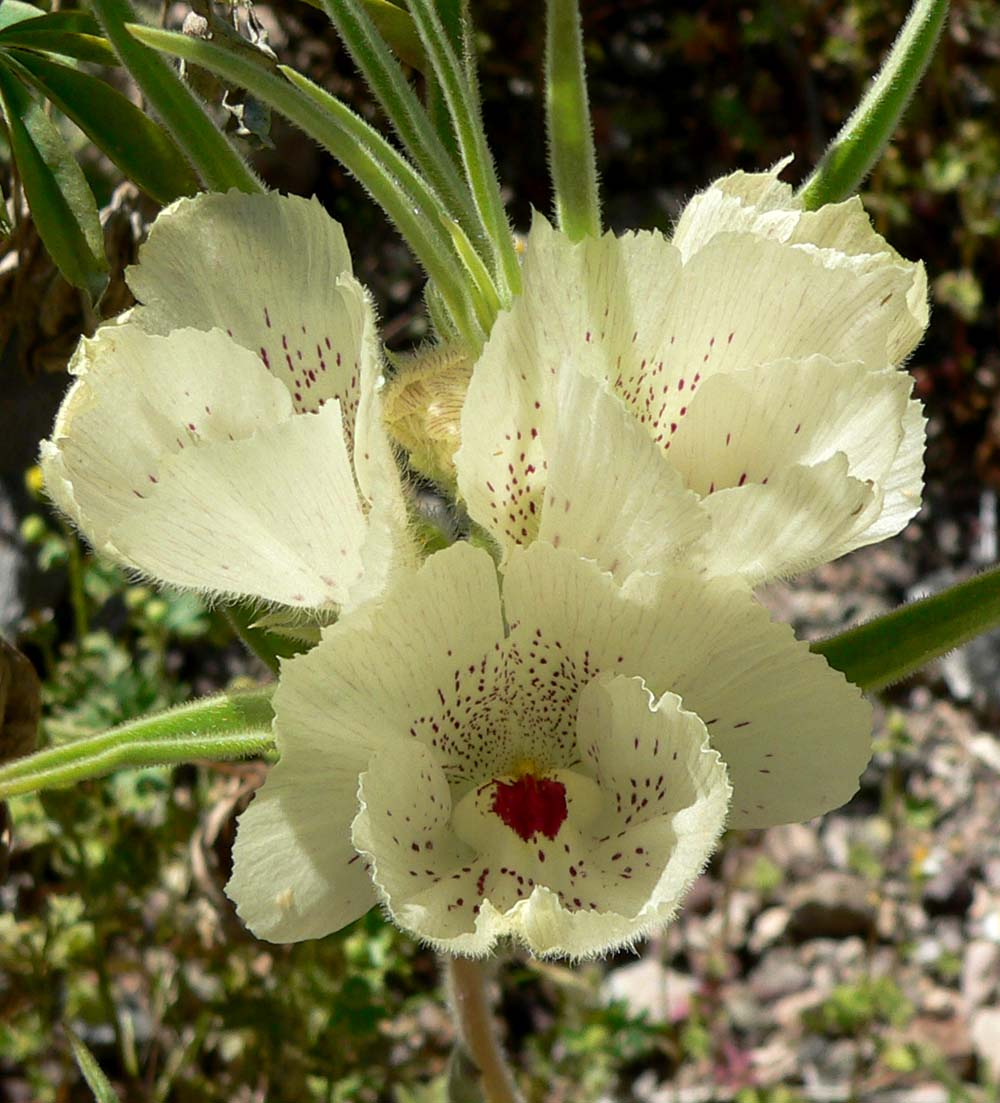

Scientific classification
- Kingdom: Plantae
- Clade: Tracheophytes
- Clade: Angiosperms
- Clade: Eudicots
- Clade: Asterids
- Order: Lamiales
- Family: Plantaginaceae
- Genus: Mohavea
- Species: M. confertiflora

Binomial name
- Mohavea confertiflora (Benth.) A.Heller

= Mohavea confertiflora =

Species of flowering plant

Mohavea confertiflora, the ghost flower, is a plant of the family Plantaginaceae. It is a native of the Southwestern United States, southern California, and three states of northwest Mexico.

It is found growing in the arid conditions of the Mojave Desert and the Sonoran Desert (including Colorado Desert), below 1,000 metres (3,300 ft) in elevation. It also grows in those deserts' sky islands habitats.

== Description ==
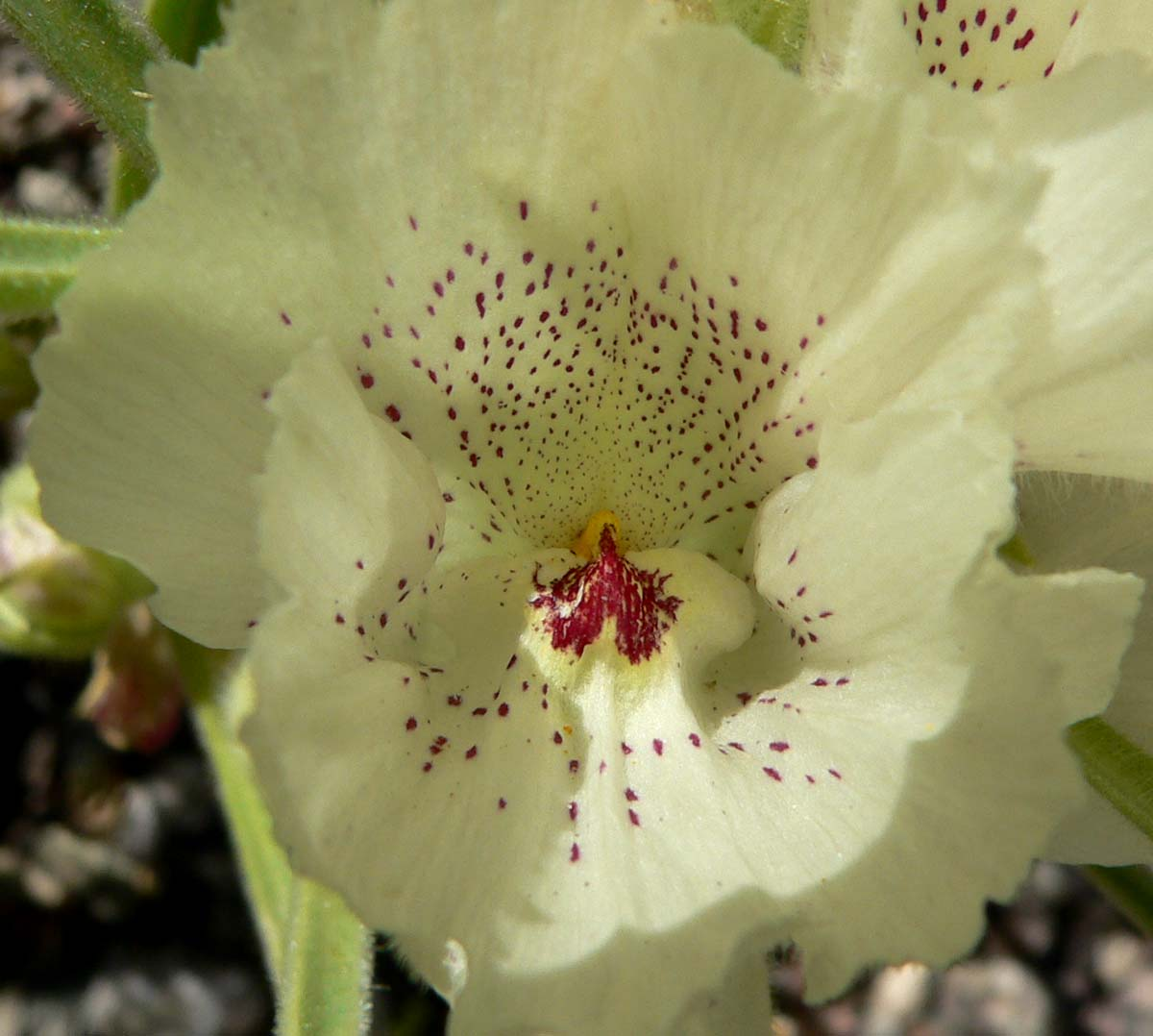
A close up of Mohavea confertiflora.

Mohavea confertiflora is an annual herb growing up to 2 feet (0.61 metres) tall. It flowers March to April. This flower, which does not produce nectar, has adapted a morphology resembling the flower Mentzelia involucrata, which often grows in the same habitat. Mentzelia involucrata produces nectar to attract female bees of the genus Xeralictus.

In areas where their ranges overlap, Mohavea confertifolia attracts the same pollinators to its flowers through floral mimicry: Mohavea flowers contain marks that resemble female Xeralictus; these marks operate as a sign stimulus to the male bee, which enters the flower and in doing so pollinates the Mohavea.
