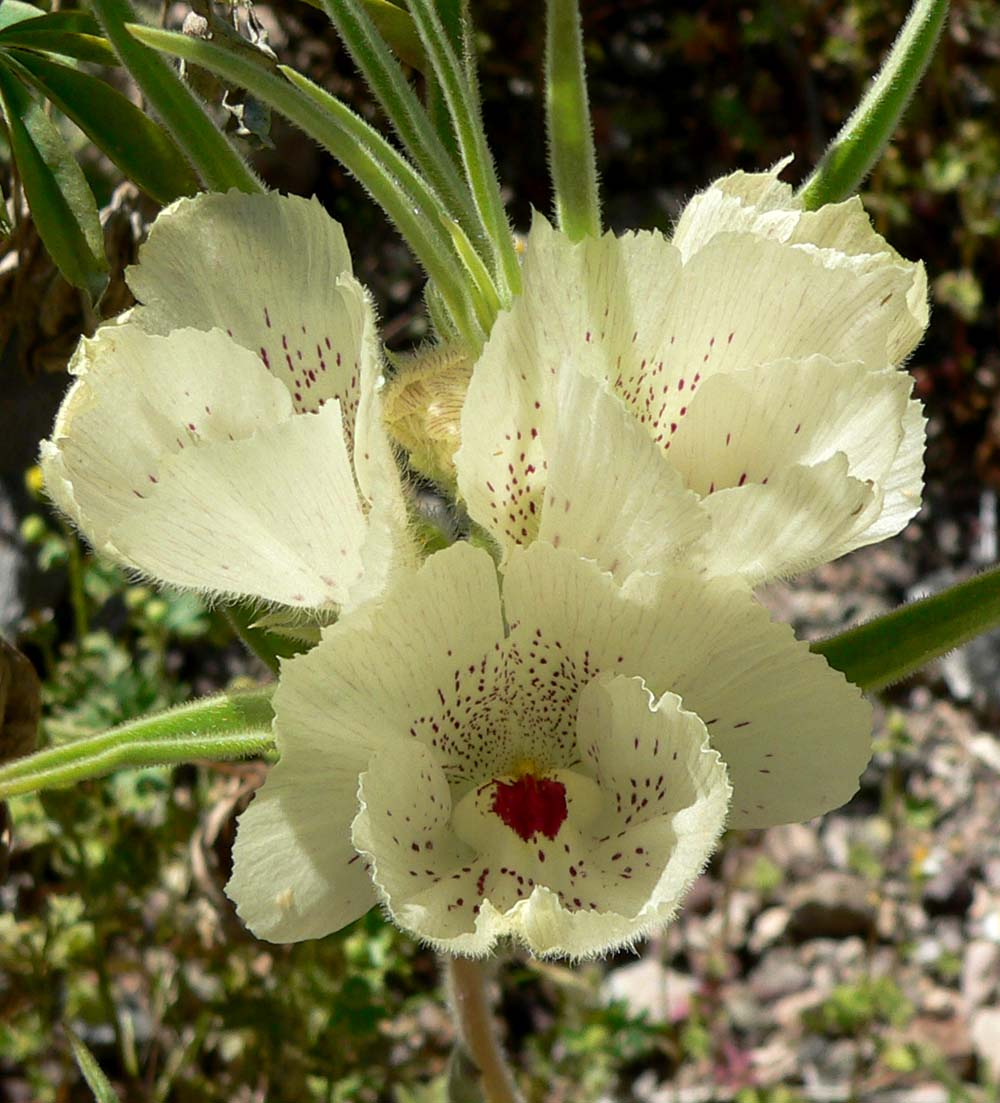
- Mohavea confertiflora

Scientific classification
- Kingdom: Plantae
- Clade: Tracheophytes
- Clade: Angiosperms
- Clade: Eudicots
- Clade: Asterids
- Order: Lamiales
- Family: Plantaginaceae
- Tribe: Antirrhineae
- Genus: Mohavea; A.Gray

Species
- Mohavea breviflora Mohavea confertiflora

= Mohavea =

Genus of flowering plants

Mohavea is a plant genus consisting of two species native to the deserts of the southwestern United States and northern Mexico. This genus is often included in the closely related snapdragon genus Antirrhinum.

== Taxonomy ==
Formerly included in the family Scrophulariaceae, the genus is now included in Plantaginaceae. The two species are both notable annuals flowering in the spring: the lesser mohavea, Mohavea breviflora, has small yellow flowers, while the ghost flower, Mohavea confertiflora, features large pale flowers with a pattern of purple spots.

=== Etymology ===
The genus name is derived from the Mojave River, where specimens were first collected by John C. Fremont.
