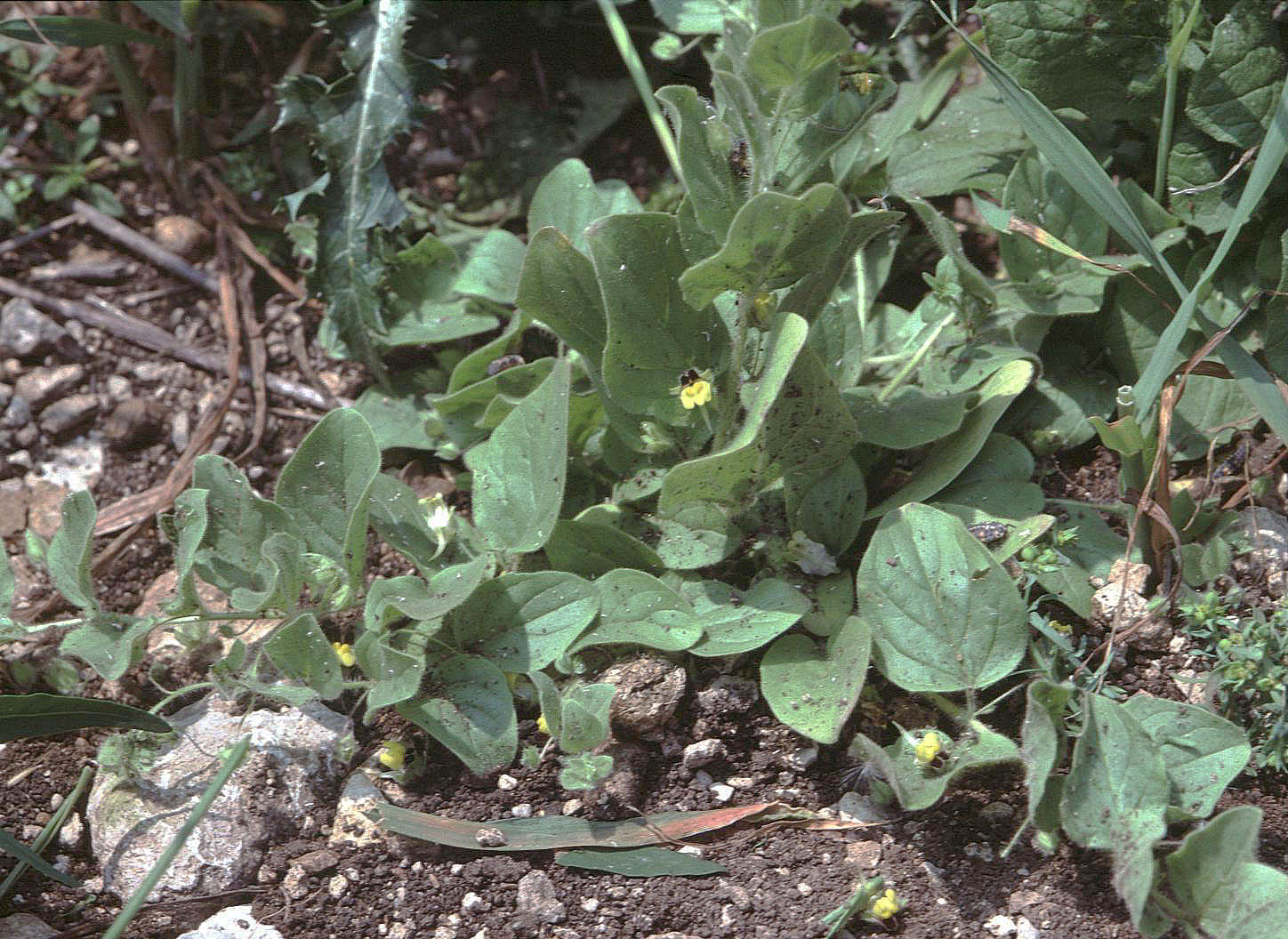

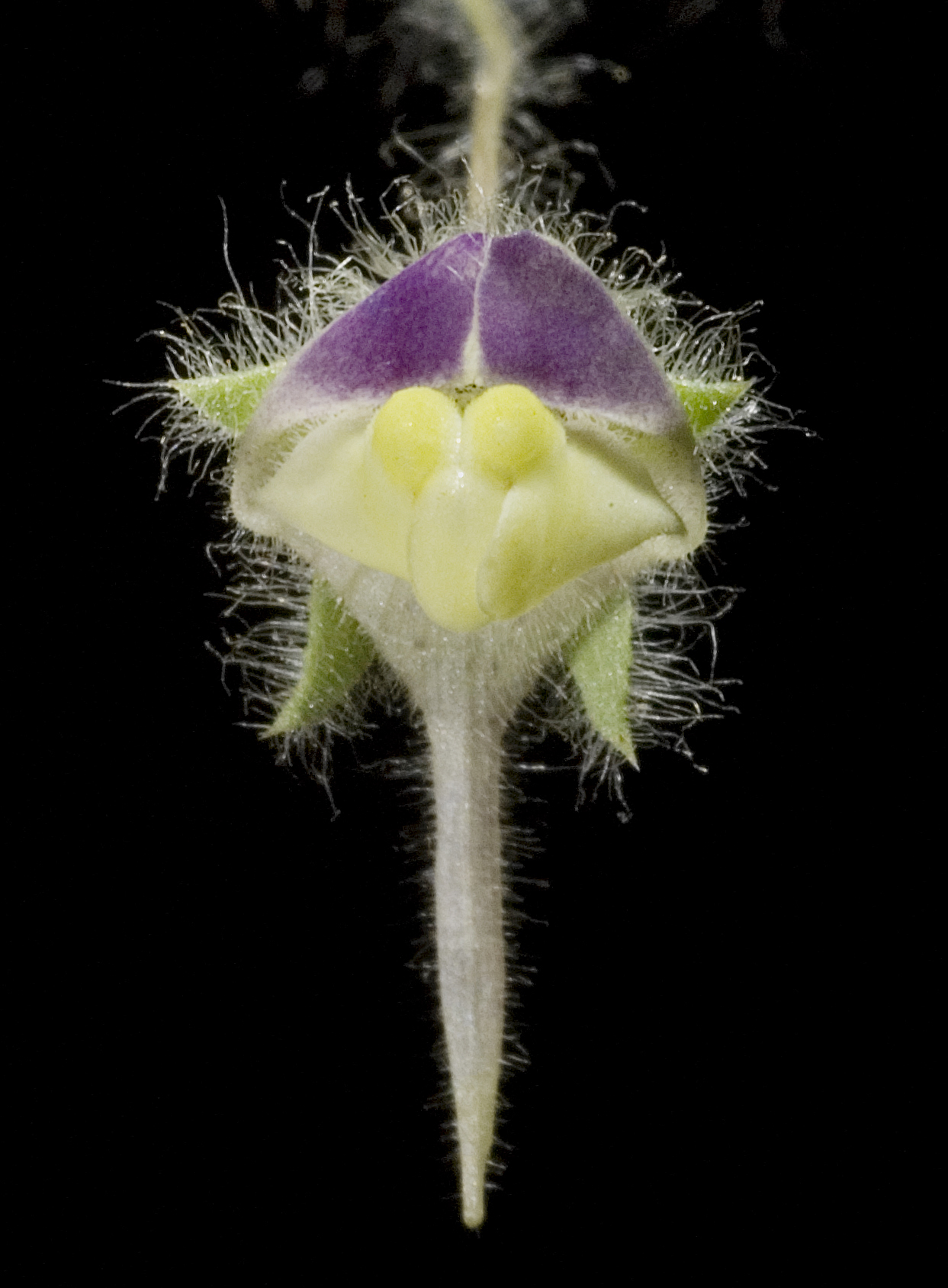

Scientific classification
- Kingdom: Plantae
- Clade: Tracheophytes
- Clade: Angiosperms
- Clade: Eudicots
- Clade: Asterids
- Order: Lamiales
- Family: Plantaginaceae
- Genus: Kickxia
- Species: K. spuria

Binomial name
- Kickxia spuria (L.) Dumort.

Synonyms
- Antirrhinum spurium

= Kickxia spuria =

Species of flowering plant

Kickxia spuria is a species of flowering plant in the family Plantaginaceae known by several common names, including roundleaf cancerwort and round-leaved fluellen. It is native to Europe and Asia, but it is present on other continents as an introduced species, and sometimes a noxious weed. This is a low hairy herb with a creeping stem with many branches. It produces rounded, fuzzy leaves at wide intervals along the stem, and solitary snapdragon-like flowers. Each flower is up to 1.5 centimeters long with a narrow, pointed spur extending from the back. The lobes of the mouth are yellow, white, and deep purple, and the whole flower is fuzzy to hairy. The fruit is a spherical capsule about 4 millimeters long. This species is similar to its relative, Kickxia elatine, but for the shape of its leaves, and the hairy flower stalk, which is bare with Kickxia elatine.
