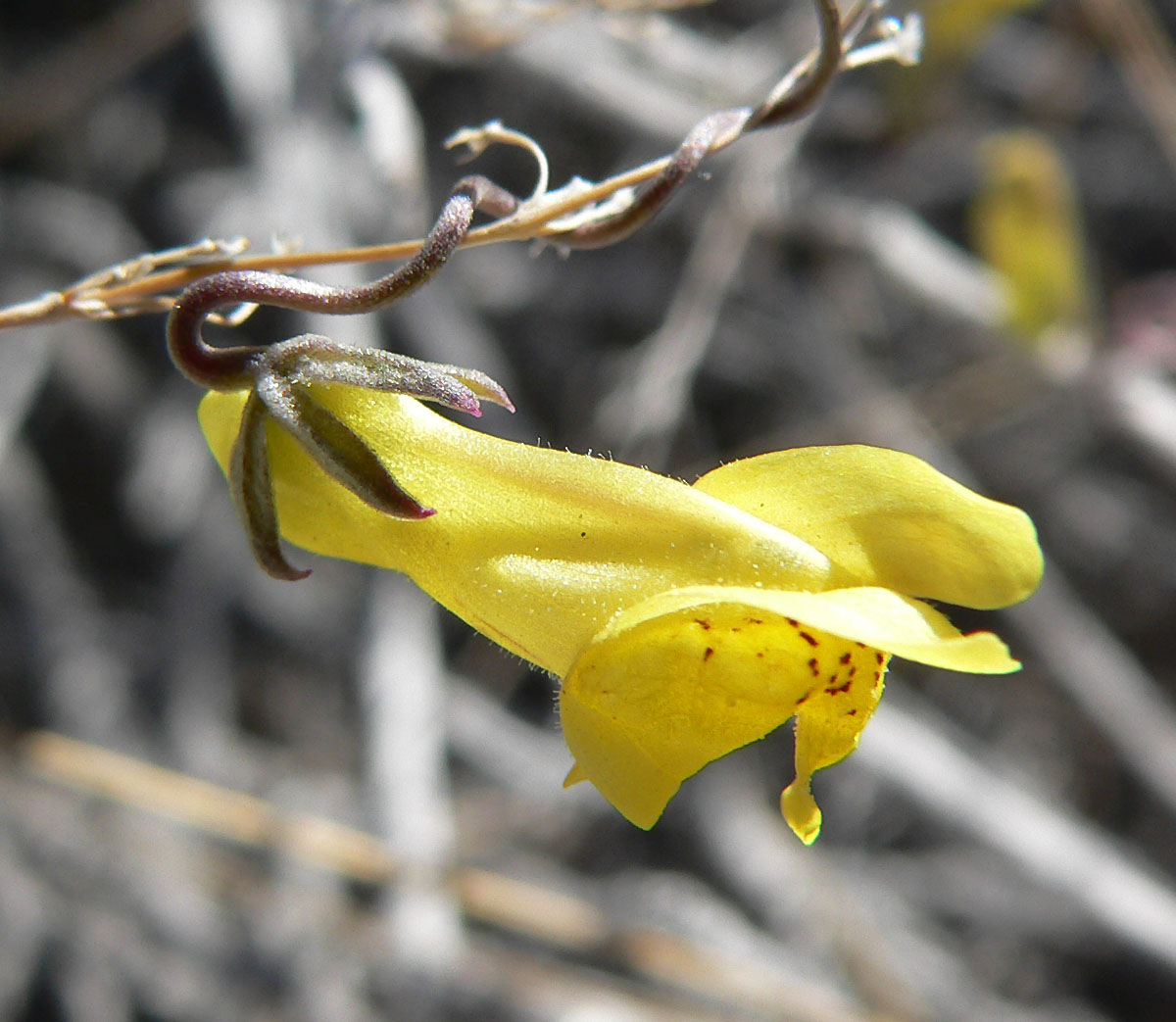
- Neogaerrhinum filipes

Scientific classification
- Kingdom: Plantae
- Clade: Tracheophytes
- Clade: Angiosperms
- Clade: Eudicots
- Clade: Asterids
- Order: Lamiales
- Family: Plantaginaceae
- Tribe: Antirrhineae
- Genus: Neogaerrhinum; Rothm.

Species
- Neogaerrhinum filipes (A.Gray) Rothm.; Neogaerrhinum strictum (Hook. & Arn.) Rothm.

= Neogaerrhinum =

Genus of flowering plants

Neogaerrhinum is a genus of the family Plantaginaceae, and is one of a group of plants commonly known as 'snapdragons'. It has two accepted species and includes species formerly considered as New World members of Antirrhinum.

== Bibliography ==
- Vargas P, JA Rosselló, R Oyama, J Güemes. 2004 Molecular evidence for naturalness of genera in the tribe Antirrhineae (Scrophulariaceae) and three independent evolutionary lineages from the New World and the Old. Plant Syst Evol 249:151–172.
