= Pseudomisopates =

Scientific classification
- Kingdom: Plantae
- Clade: Tracheophytes
- Clade: Angiosperms
- Clade: Eudicots
- Clade: Asterids
- Order: Lamiales
- Family: Plantaginaceae
- Genus: Pseudomisopates; Güemes (1997)
- Species: P. rivas-martinezii

Binomial name
- Pseudomisopates rivas-martinezii (Sánchez Mata) Güemes (1997)

Synonyms
- Acanthorrhinum rivas-martinezii (Sánchez Mata) Fern.Casas & Sánchez Mata (1988); Misopates rivas-martinezii Sánchez Mata (1988)

Genus of plants

Pseudomisopates is a monotypic genus of flowering plants belonging to the family Plantaginaceae. The only species is Pseudomisopates rivas-martinezii. It is a subshrub native to central Spain.
