= Castillo de San Julián =

Fort in Cartagena, Spain

- Cartagena, Spain
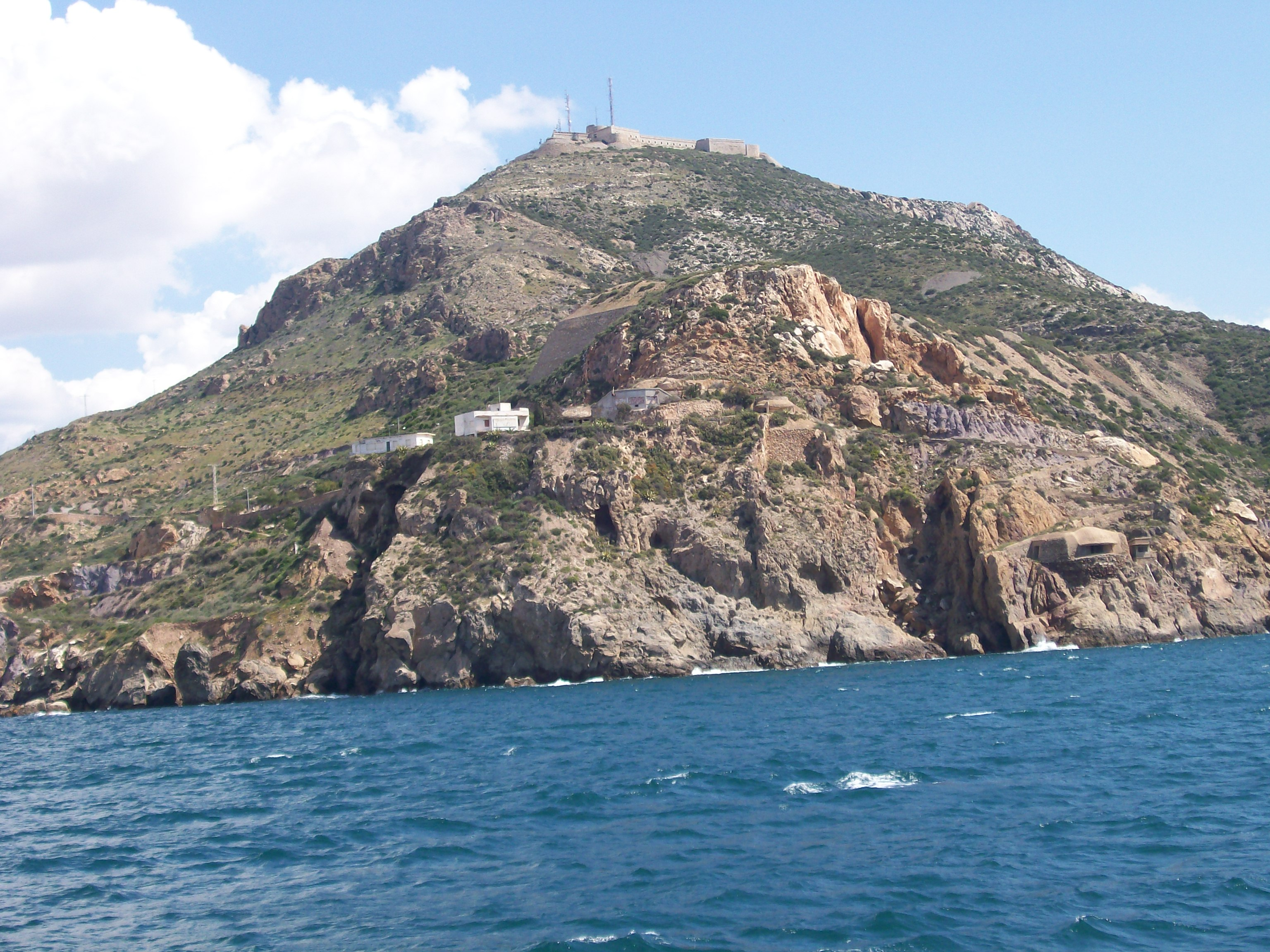
- View of the Castillo de San Julián

Site information
- Type: Fort
- Controlled by: Telefónica
- Condition: Intact but dilapidated

Location
- Coordinates: 37°34′53.63″N 0°57′57.3″W

Site history
- Built: 1706 (tower); 18th century–1883 (fort)
- Built by: Kingdom of Great Britain (tower); Kingdom of Spain (fort)

The Castillo de San Julián, also known as Saint Julian's Fort, is a fort in Cartagena, Spain. It was built during the 18th and 19th centuries, incorporating a tower which had been built by the British in 1706. The fort remains intact today, but it is in a rather dilapidated state.

== History ==
The Castillo de San Julián is located on and takes its name from the Monte de San Julián. In 1706, the British captured Cartagena during the War of the Spanish Succession, and they built a cylindrical tower on the hill. Following the end of the war, the Spanish began to build a fort on the hill in order to protect the mouth of Cartagena's harbour. The new fort incorporated the British tower, and construction took a very long time, being completed in 1883.

The fort was used as a military prison during the Spanish Civil War.

Today, the fort is still intact but it is in a rather dilapidated state. It is listed on the Bien de Interés Cultural, and is currently owned by Telefónica, who have installed a number of antennas within the fort. The city administration is attempting to acquire and restore the fort.

== Layout ==
The Castillo de San Julián is essentially a bastioned fort, but it also contains tenailles and caponiers, which are typical of polygonal forts. It is built in neoclassical architecture.
