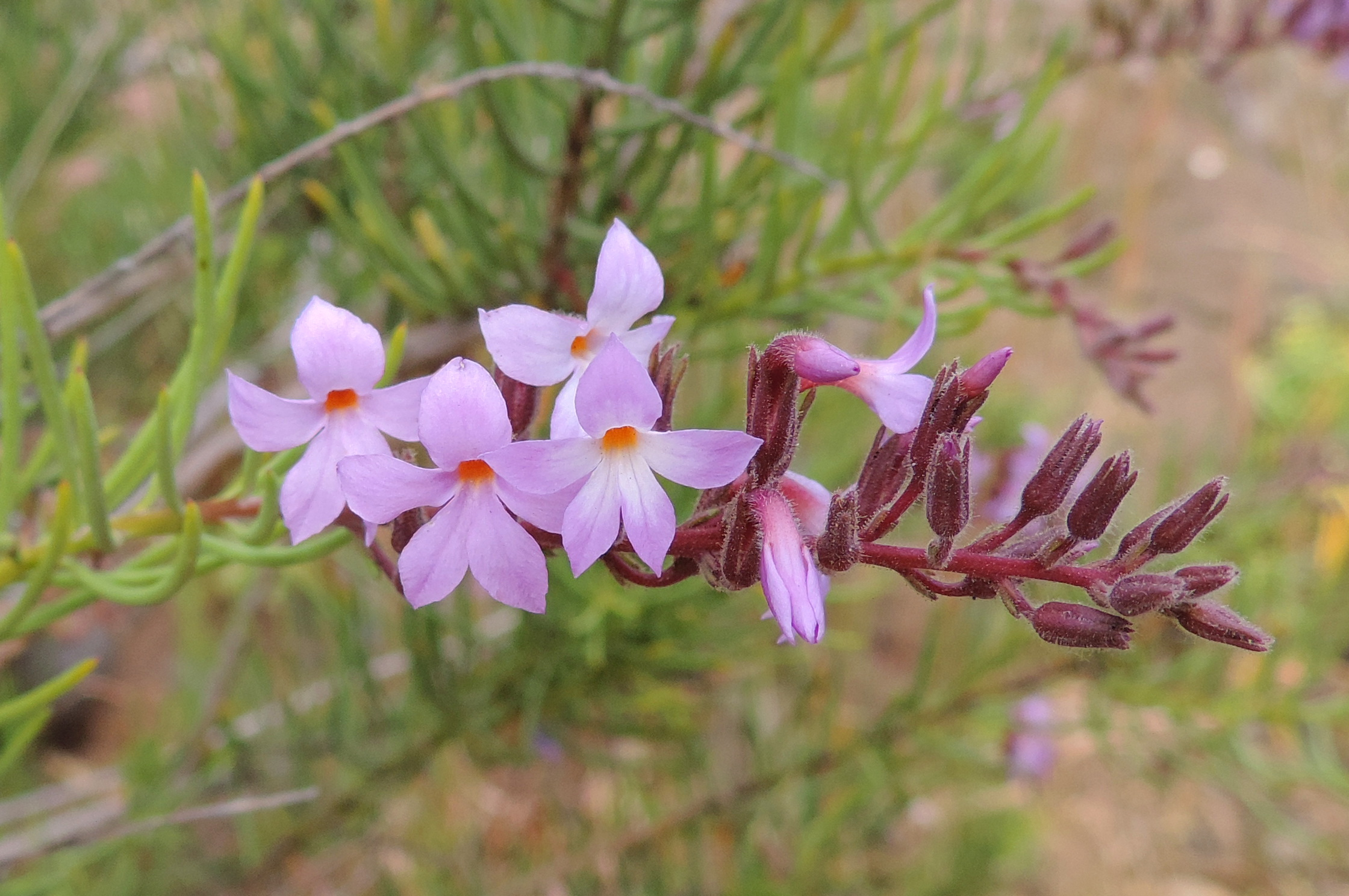
- Campylanthus salsoloides

Scientific classification
- Kingdom: Plantae
- Clade: Tracheophytes
- Clade: Angiosperms
- Clade: Eudicots
- Clade: Asterids
- Order: Lamiales
- Family: Plantaginaceae
- Genus: Campylanthus; Roth

= Campylanthus =

Genus of flowering plants

Campylanthus is a genus of flowering plants belonging to the family Plantaginaceae.

Its native range is Macaronesia, Northeastern Tropical Africa, Arabian Peninsula, Pakistan.

Species:

- Campylanthus anisotrichus (A.G.Mill.) Hjertson & A.G.Mill.
- Campylanthus antonii Thulin
- Campylanthus chascaniflorus A.G.Mill.
- Campylanthus glaber Benth.
- Campylanthus hajarensis Hjertson, Henrot & Thulin
- Campylanthus hubaishanii N.Kilian & P.Hein
- Campylanthus incanus A.G.Mill.
- Campylanthus junceus Edgew.
- Campylanthus mirandae A.G.Mill.
- Campylanthus parviflorus Hjertson & A.G.Mill.
- Campylanthus pungens Schwartz
- Campylanthus ramosissimus Wight
- Campylanthus reconditus Hjertson & Thulin
- Campylanthus salsoloides (L.f.) Roth
- Campylanthus sedoides A.G.Mill.
- Campylanthus somaliensis A.G.Mill.
- Campylanthus spinosus Balf.f.
- Campylanthus yemenensis A.G.Mill.
