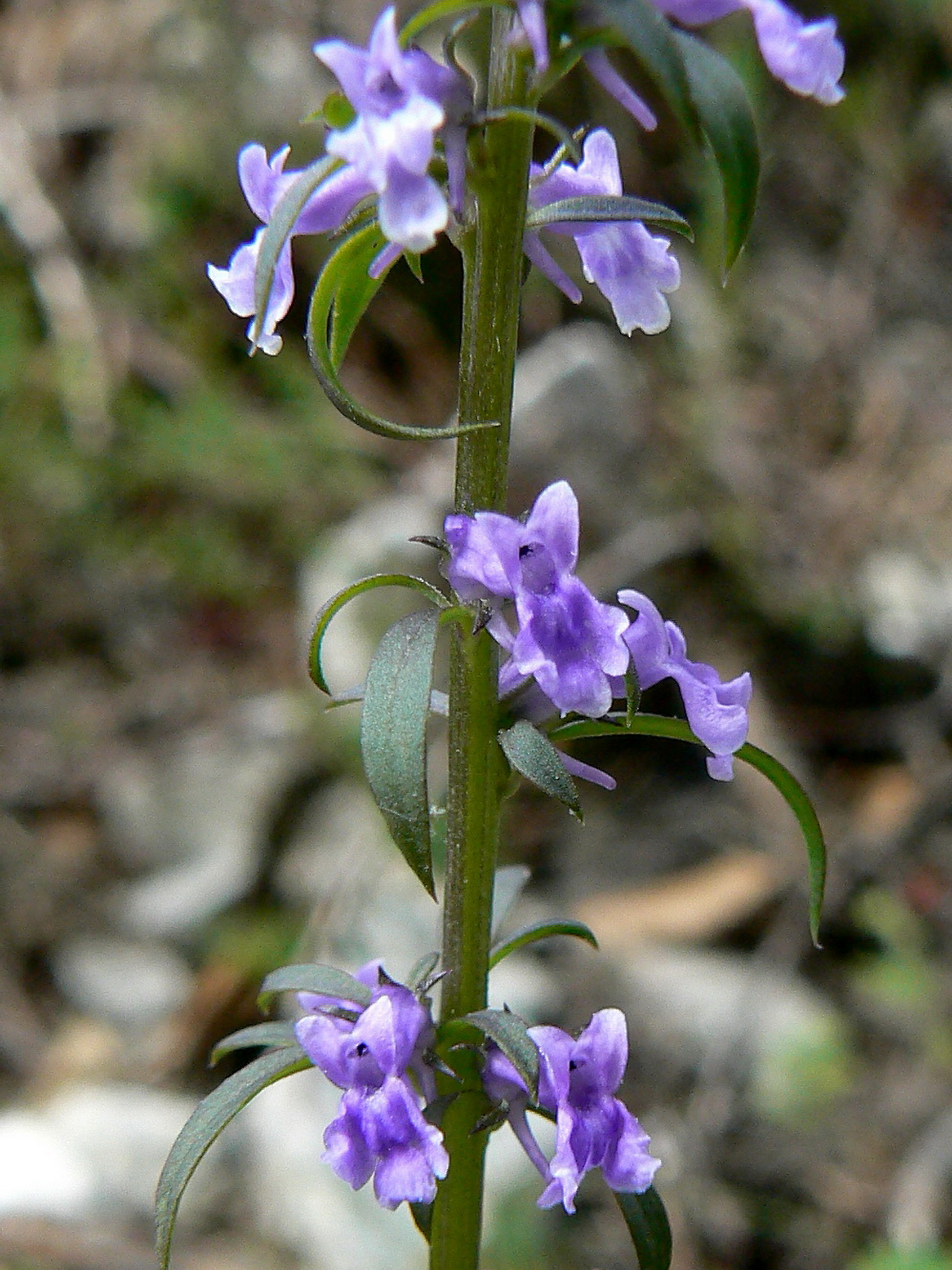
- Anarrhinum bellidifolium

Scientific classification
- Kingdom: Plantae
- Clade: Tracheophytes
- Clade: Angiosperms
- Clade: Eudicots
- Clade: Asterids
- Order: Lamiales
- Family: Plantaginaceae
- Tribe: Antirrhineae
- Genus: Anarrhinum; Desf.

= Anarrhinum =

Genus of flowering plants

Anarrhinum is a genus of flowering plants belonging to the family Plantaginaceae.

Its native range is the Mediterranean Basin and West Asia with some reaching as far as Germany and Ethiopia.

Species:

- Anarrhinum bellidifolium (L.) Willd.
- Anarrhinum corsicum Jord. & Fourr.
- Anarrhinum duriminium (Brot.) Pers.
- Anarrhinum forskaohlii (J. F. Gmel.) Cufod.
- Anarrhinum fruticosum Desf.
- Anarrhinum laxiflorum Boiss.
- Anarrhinum longipedicellatum R. Fern.
- Anarrhinum pedatum Desf.
