= Albraunia =

Scientific classification
- Kingdom: Plantae
- Clade: Tracheophytes
- Clade: Angiosperms
- Clade: Eudicots
- Clade: Asterids
- Order: Lamiales
- Family: Plantaginaceae
- Genus: Albraunia; Speta

Genus of flowering plants

Albraunia is a genus of flowering plants belonging to the family Plantaginaceae.

Its native range is Iran and Iraq.

Species:

- Albraunia foveopilosa Speta
- Albraunia fugax (Boiss. & Noë) Speta
- Albraunia psilosperma Speta
