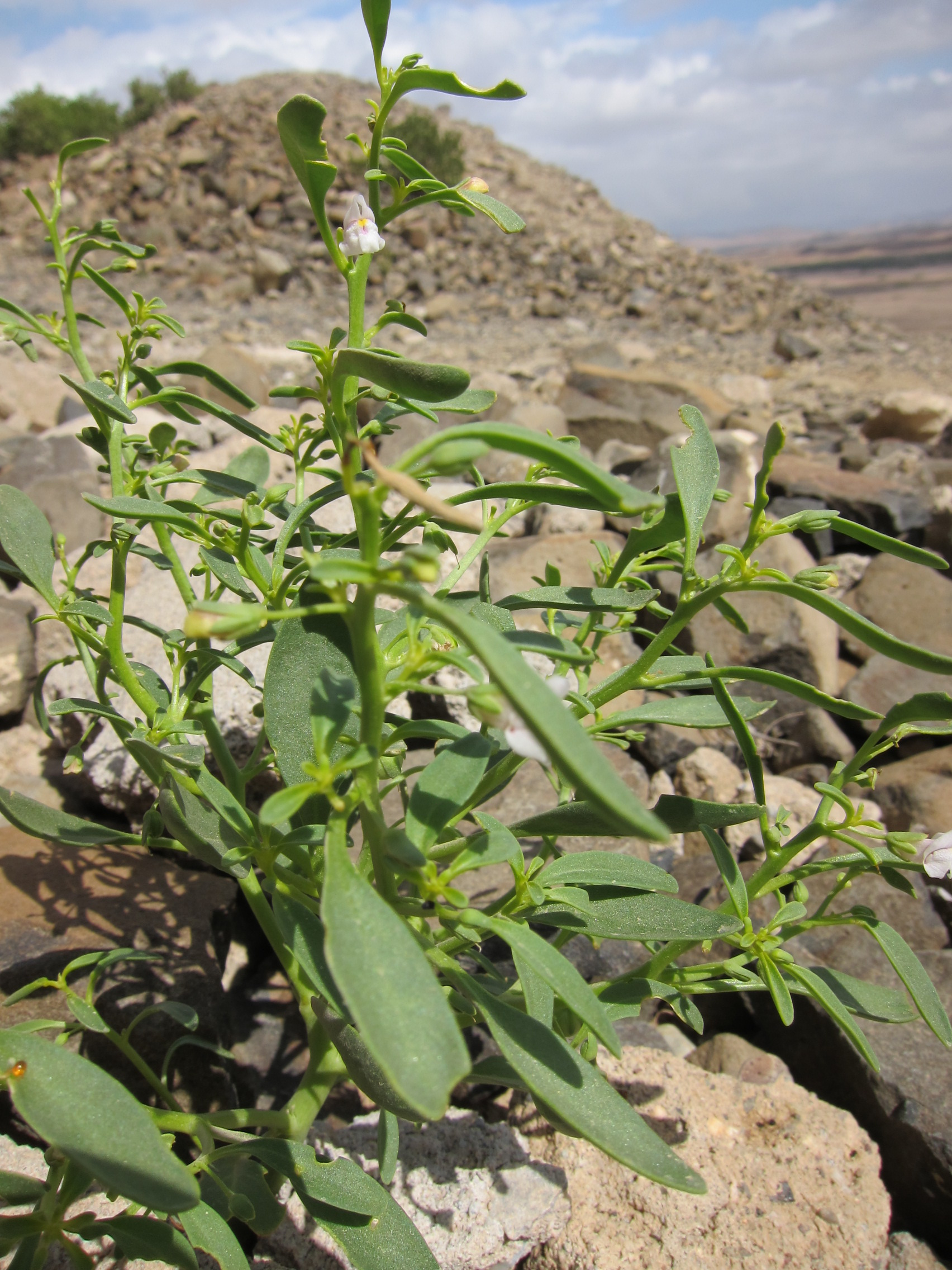
- Schweinfurthia pterosperma in Djibouti

Scientific classification
- Kingdom: Plantae
- Clade: Tracheophytes
- Clade: Angiosperms
- Clade: Eudicots
- Clade: Asterids
- Order: Lamiales
- Family: Plantaginaceae
- Genus: Schweinfurthia; A.Braun

Synonyms
- Etornotus Raf.

= Schweinfurthia (plant) =

Genus of flowering plant

Schweinfurthia is a genus of flowering plants belonging to the family Plantaginaceae. It is also in Tribe Antirrhineae.

Its native range is north-eastern and eastern Tropical Africa (within Djibouti, Eritrea, Ethiopia, Socotra, Somalia, Sudan and Tanzania), the island of Comoros (in the western Indian Ocean), Arabian Peninsula (within Oman, Saudi Arabia and Yemen), Afghanistan, Iran to Pakistan and India.

The genus name of Schweinfurthia is in honour of Georg August Schweinfurth (1836–1925), a Baltic German botanist and ethnologist who explored East Central Africa. It was first described and published in Sitzungsber. Ges. Naturf. Freunde Berlin Vol.20 on page 24 in 1866.

== Known species ==
According to Kew:

- Schweinfurthia imbricata A.G.Mill., M.Short & D.A.Sutton
- Schweinfurthia latifolia Baker
- Schweinfurthia papilionacea (L.) Boiss.
- Schweinfurthia pedicellata (T.Anderson) Balf.f.
- Schweinfurthia pterosperma (A.Rich.) A.Braun
- Schweinfurthia spinosa A.G.Mill., M.Short & D.A.Sutton
