= Georg August Schweinfurth =

Baltic German botanist and ethnologist (1836–1925)

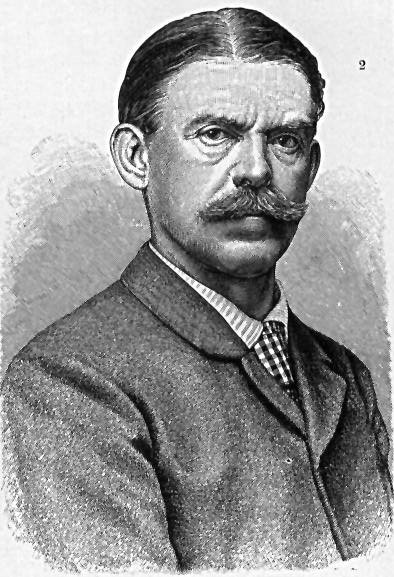
- Born: 29 December 1836; Riga, Russian Empire
- Died: 19 September 1925 (aged 88); Berlin, Weimar Republic
- Awards: Founder's Medal (1874); Vega Medal (1899)
- Scientific career
- Fields: Botany
- Author abbrev. (botany): Schweinf.

Georg August Schweinfurth (29 December 1836 – 19 September 1925) was a Baltic German botanist and ethnologist who explored East Central Africa.

== Life and explorations ==
He was born at Riga, Latvia, then part of the Russian Empire. He was educated at the universities of Heidelberg, Munich and Berlin (1856–1862), where he particularly devoted himself to botany and palaeontology.

Commissioned to arrange the collections brought from Sudan by Adalbert von Barnim and Robert Hartmann, his attention was directed to that region; and in 1863, he travelled round the shores of the Red Sea, repeatedly traversed the district between that sea and the Nile, passed on to Khartoum, and returned to Europe in 1866.

In 1866, botanist A.Braun published Schweinfurthia which is a genus of flowering plants from Africa and Asia, belonging to the family Plantaginaceae and named in Georg August Schweinfurth's honour.

His researches attracted so much attention that in 1868 the Berlin-based Alexander von Humboldt Foundation entrusted him with an important scientific mission to the interior of East Africa. Starting from Khartoum in January 1869, he went up the White Nile to Bahr-el-Ghazal, and then, with a party of ivory dealers, through the regions inhabited by the Diur (Dyoor), Dinka, Bongo and Niam-Niam; crossing the Congo-Nile watershed he entered the country of the Mangbetu (Monbuttu) and discovered the river Uele (March 19, 1870), which by its westward flow he knew was independent of the Nile. Schweinfurth formed the conclusion that it belonged to the Chad system, and it was several years before its connection with the Congo was demonstrated.

The discovery of the Uele was Schweinfurth's greatest geographical achievement, though he did much to elucidate the hydrography of the Bahr-el-Ghazal system. Of greater importance were the very considerable additions he made to the knowledge of the inhabitants and of the flora and fauna of Central Africa. He described in detail the cannibalistic practices of the Mangbetu, and his discovery of the pygmy Aka people settled conclusively the question as to the existence of dwarf races in tropical Africa. Unfortunately, a December 1870 fire in his camp destroyed nearly all that he had collected. He returned to Khartoum in July 1871 and published an account of the expedition, under the title of Im Herzen von Afrika (Leipzig, 1874; English edition, The Heart of Africa, 1873, new ed. 1878).

In 1873-1874 he accompanied Friedrich Gerhard Rohlfs in his expedition into the Libyan Desert. Settling at Cairo in 1875, he founded a geographical society, under the auspices of the Khedive Ismail, and devoted himself almost exclusively to African studies, historical and ethnographical. In 1876, he travelled into the Arabian Desert with Paul Güssfeldt, and continued his explorations therein at intervals until 1888, and during the same period made geological and botanical investigations in the Fayum, in the valley of the Nile. In 1889 he returned to Berlin; but he visited the Italian colony of Eritrea in 1891, 1892 and 1894. Schweinfurth died in Berlin.

The accounts of all his travels and researches have appeared either in book or pamphlet form or in periodicals, such as Petermanns Mitteilungen, the Zeitschrift für Erdkunde. Among his works may be mentioned Artes Africanae: Illustrations and Descriptions of Productions of the Industrial Arts of Central African Tribes (1875).

== Works ==
- The Heart of Africa or Three Years' Travels and Adventures in the Unexplored Regions of the Centre of Africa. From 1868 to 1871. 1873
- Schweinfurth, G.A. (1912). Arabische Pflanzennamen aus Ägypten, Algerien und Jemen (Arabic plant names from Egypt, Algeria and Yemen) (in Arabic and German). Berlin: Reimer. ISBN 9783836423311. OCLC 244045304. (reprinted in Saarbrücken, Germany, in 2007 by VDM Verlag Dr. Müller)

== See also ==
- List of Baltic German scientists

== Scientific Legacy ==
- The eastern chimpanzee Pan troglodytes schweinfurthii is named after him. Botanical specimens collected by Schweinfurth are cared for at multiple institutions, including the Kew Herbarium, Plantentuin Meise, the Swedish Museum of Natural History, and the National Herbarium of Victoria, Royal Botanic Gardens Victoria.
