= Holzneria =

Scientific classification
- Kingdom: Plantae
- Clade: Tracheophytes
- Clade: Angiosperms
- Clade: Eudicots
- Clade: Asterids
- Order: Lamiales
- Family: Plantaginaceae
- Genus: Holzneria; Speta

Genus of plants

Holzneria is a genus of flowering plants belonging to the family Plantaginaceae.

Its native range is Iran to Central Asia and Afghanistan. It is found in the countries of Afghanistan, Iran, Kazakhstan, Kyrgyzstan, Tajikistan, Turkmenistan and Uzbekistan.

The genus name of Holzneria is in honour of Wolfgang Holzner (1942–2014), Austrian botanist, Japanologist, and professor in Vienna. It was first described and published by Franz Speta in Bot. Jahrb. Syst. Vol.103 on page 16 in 1982.

Known species, according to Kew

- Holzneria microcentron (Bornm.) Speta
- Holzneria spicata (Korovin) Speta
