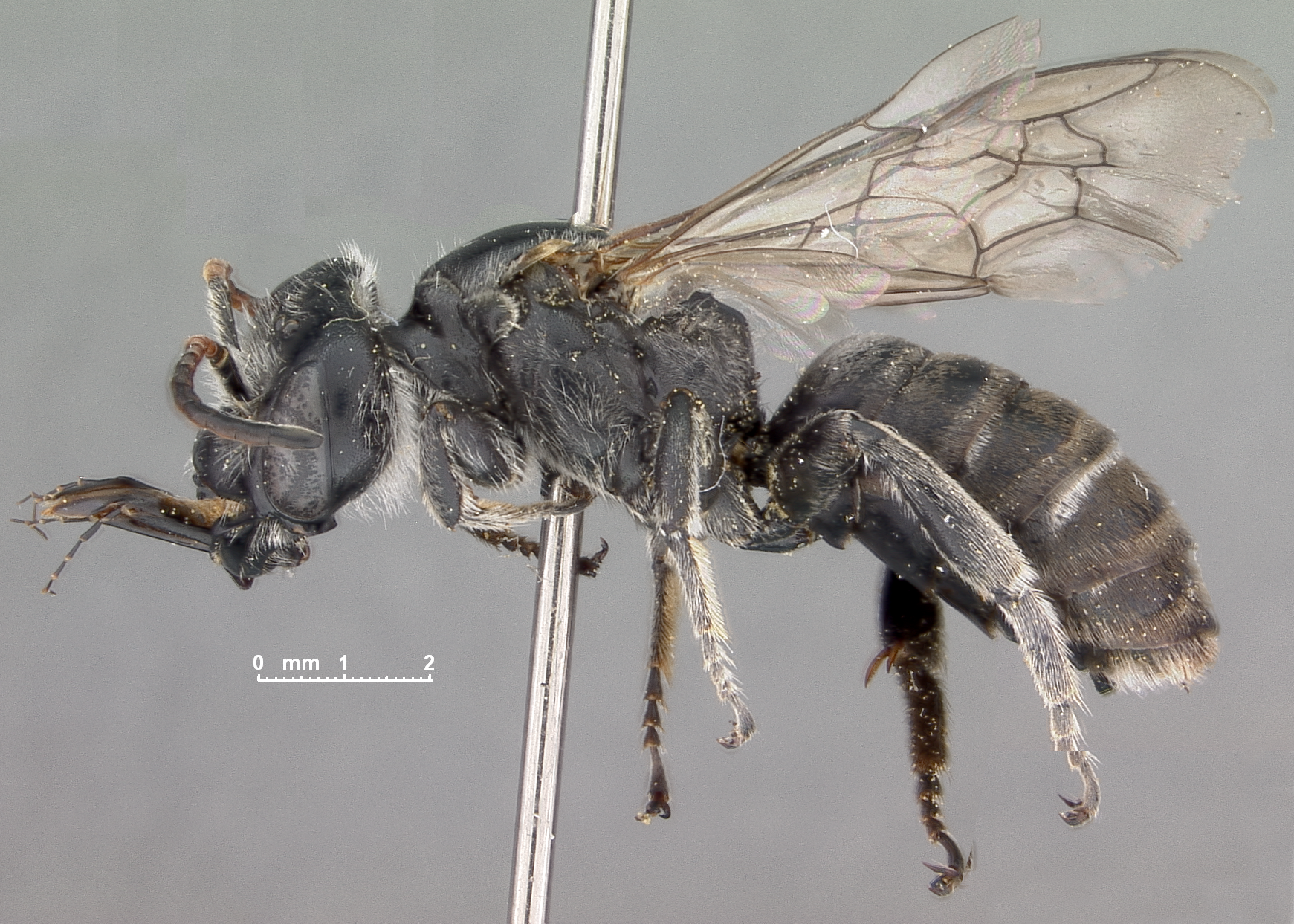
- Xeralictus timberlakei

Scientific classification
- Kingdom: Animalia
- Phylum: Arthropoda
- Class: Insecta
- Order: Hymenoptera
- Family: Halictidae
- Subfamily: Rophitinae
- Genus: Xeralictus; Cockerell, 1927

= Xeralictus =

Genus of bees

Xeralictus is a genus of sweat bees in the family Halictidae. There are at least three described species in Xeralictus.

== Species ==
These three species belong to the genus Xeralictus:

- Xeralictus bicuspidariae Snelling & Stage, 1995
- Xeralictus biscuspidariae
- Xeralictus timberlakei Cockerell, 1927
