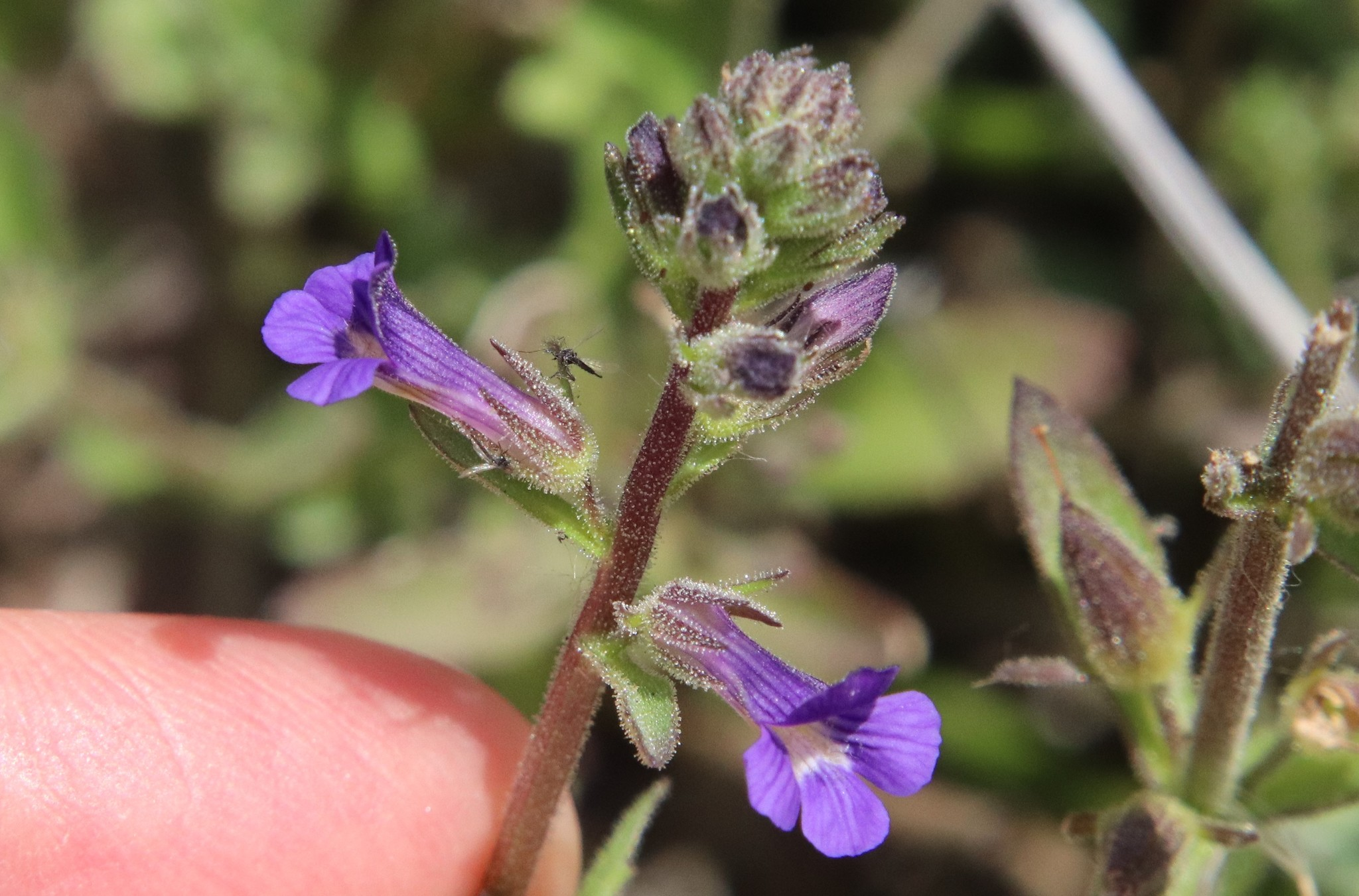
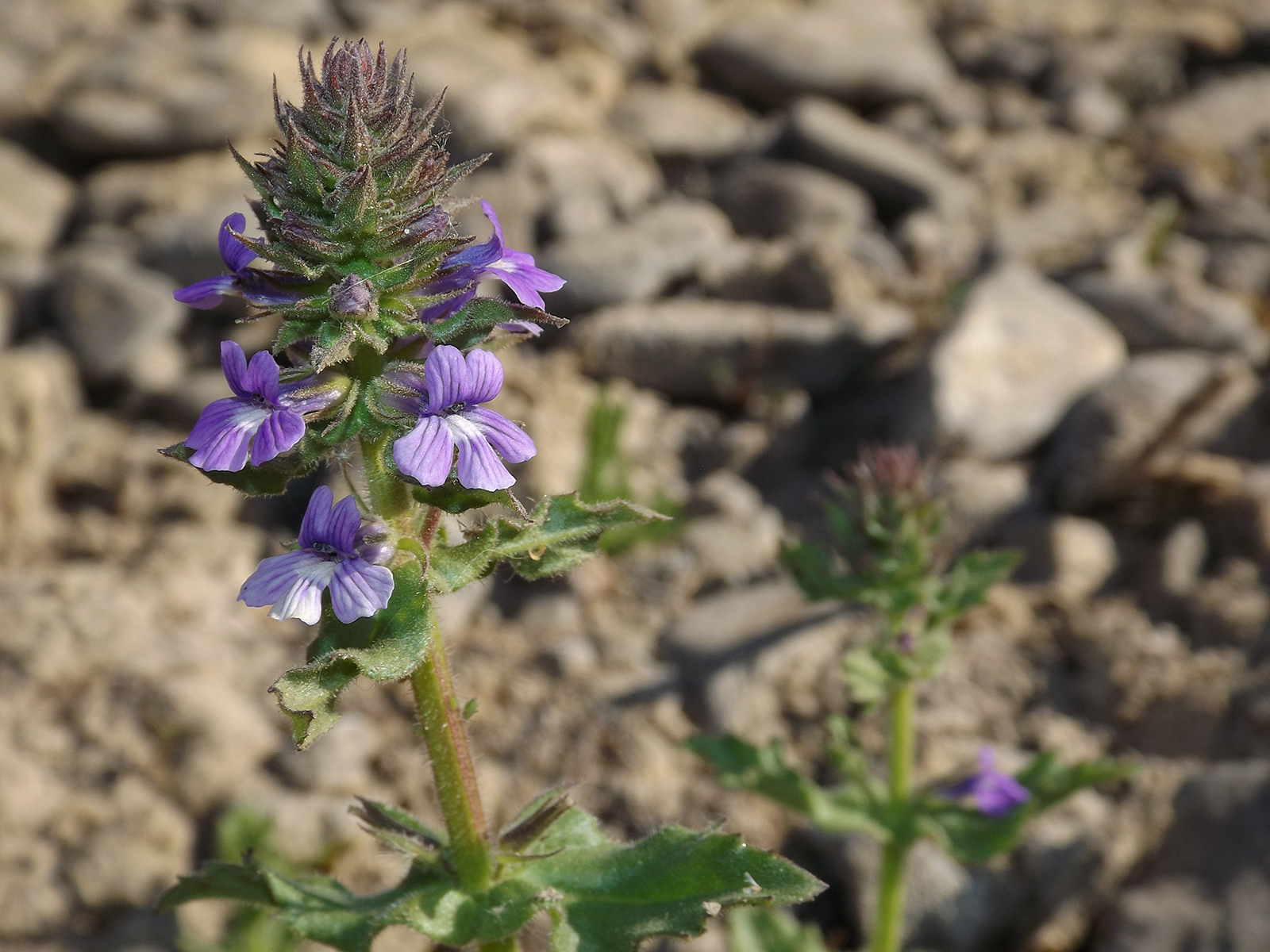
- Stemodia durantifolia var. durantifolia (top) and var. chilensis (bottom)

Conservation status
- Secure (NatureServe)

Scientific classification
- Kingdom: Plantae
- Clade: Tracheophytes
- Clade: Angiosperms
- Clade: Eudicots
- Clade: Asterids
- Order: Lamiales
- Family: Plantaginaceae
- Genus: Stemodia
- Species: S. durantifolia

Binomial name
- Stemodia durantifolia (L.) Sw.

Synonyms
- Stemodiacra durantifolia (L.) Kuntze in Revis. Gen. Pl. 2: 466 (1891); Capraria durantifolia L. in Syst. Nat. ed. 10. 2: 1116 (1759)

= Stemodia durantifolia =

Species of flowering plant

Stemodia durantifolia is a species of flowering plant in the plantain family commonly known as the whitewoolly twintip and purple stemodia. Stemodia durantifolia is native to the Americas, including Chile, Mexico, Texas, and the deserts of California and Arizona, and is often found in riparian habitats, preferring wet sand and rocks. It is a perennial herb producing a hairy, glandular, erect stem 10–100 cm (3.9–39.4 in) tall, with the toothed lance-shaped leaves found in pairs or triplets, attached to the stem with clasping bases. The inflorescence is a raceme of violet flowers, with each corolla held in a calyx of hairy, pointed sepals, and can often be found in bloom year-round. Although globally at low risk of extinction, Stemodia durantifolia is imperiled in California due to its rarity and threats from development.

== Description ==
=== Characteristics ===
Stemodia durantifolia is a perennial herbaceous plant to 100 cm (39 in) tall, with glandular-hairy herbage. The branching habit is both basal and axillary. The leaves are lanceolate and subsessile, and toothed along their edges. The terminal inflorescence is an ascending, spike-like structure. The bracts are equal to or slightly longer in length to the flowers or more or less equal to the length of the sepals. The flowers have a violet corolla. The sepals measure equal to or longer than half of the length of the corolla.

These characteristics differentiate it from other Stemodia species in its range. In comparison, S. pusilla is an annual with petiolate leaves and inflorescences that are not spike-like, S. lanceolata grows taller, only branches basally, and has longer bracts and sepals, S. stricta is slightly taller, has a flexuous inflorescence, and shorter bracts and sepals, S. hyptoides shares the basal and axillary branching, but has an axillary inflorescence, shorter bracts, and equal to or shorter sepals, and S. maritima has corollas less than 5 mm (0.20 in) long, stalked pollen sacs, and is usually found in the Caribbean and elsewhere in the tropics.

Stemodia durantifolia flowers all year.

=== Morphology ===
Stemodia durantifolia is a perennial herbaceous or suffrutescent plant, with the stiffly erect or ascending stems reaching 10–100 cm (3.9–39.4 in) tall. The herbage is glandular- or eglandular-hairy, with crinkly hairs in the variety chilensis. The leaves are arranged opposite or verticillate, with the variety chilensis possessing more verticillate leaves than the typical variety. The leaf blade is shaped lanceolate to oblong, and measures 15–50 mm (0.59–1.97 in) long by 3–15 mm (0.12–0.59 in) wide. The larger leaves and subsessile and clasping. The leaf margins are serrate distally.

The inflorescences are ascending, upper flowering stems are spiciform (spike-like), with the leaves becoming reduced bracts. The pedicels measure 2–12 mm (0.079–0.472 in) long. The calyx is split into 5 sepals, usually equal in size or with the posterior one sometimes longer. The sepals measure 5–7 mm (0.20–0.28 in) or 3–5 mm (0.12–0.20 in) long and have a narrowly lanceolate, long-tapered shape. The corolla is tubular, puberulent, and measures 7–10 mm (0.28–0.39 in) or 5–8 mm (0.20–0.31 in) long depending on the variety, and is violet or purple. The corolla is two-lipped, with the upper lobe suberect and the lower lip 3-lobed. The style is 2–4 mm (0.079–0.157 in) long and often persists into fruit. The fruits are 4–5 mm (0.16–0.20 in) long, ovoid-cylindric capsules, with 10 to 150 brown ellipsoid seeds that measure 2–3 mm (0.079–0.118 in).

== Taxonomy ==
=== Subspecies ===
- Stemodia durantifolia (L.) Sw. var. durantifolia — The autonymic variety. Characterized by a corolla 5–8 mm (0.20–0.31 in) long, with the stems usually glandular-pubescent, and with a widespread distribution from the southwestern United States to northern South America.
- Stemodia durantifolia (L.) Sw. var. chilensis C. Cowan — Commonly known as the Chilean stemodia. Characterized by a larger corolla 9–11 mm (0.35–0.43 in) long, more often verticillate leaves, and a predominance of crinkly hairs on the stems, with some glandular hairs intermixed. Found in Chile and parts of Argentina.

== Distribution and habitat ==
=== Distribution ===
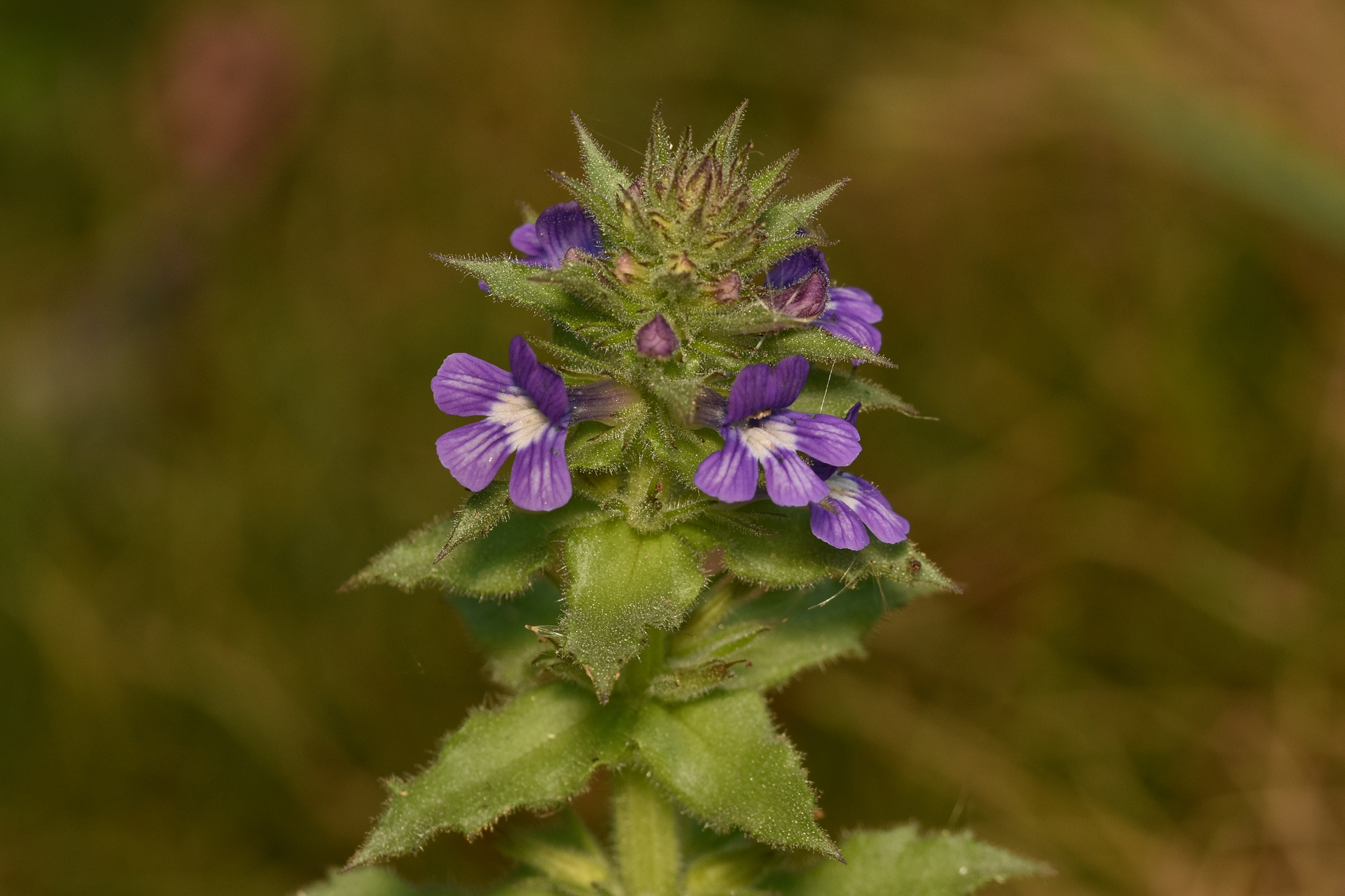
Detail of inflorescence on Stemodia durantifolia var. chilensis

Stemodia durantifolia is native to the Americas, and is found in a wide distribution spanning from the southwestern United States to Chile.

In the United States, Stemodia durantifolia is found in California, Arizona, and Texas, with introduced populations in Florida. This species is uncommon in California and is found rarely in San Diego County and in the canyons near Palm Springs in Riverside County. In Arizona, this species is found in Gila, Maricopa, Pinal, and Pima counties.

In Mexico, Stemodia durantifolia is found in 29 states in the country, ranging from Baja California to Tamaulipas to Quintana Roo. On the Baja California Peninsula, which includes the states of Baja California and Baja California Sur, this species is found sparsely from canyons in the eastern Sierra de Juarez to more commonly in wetlands from the Sierra de la Libertad to the Cape of the peninsula.

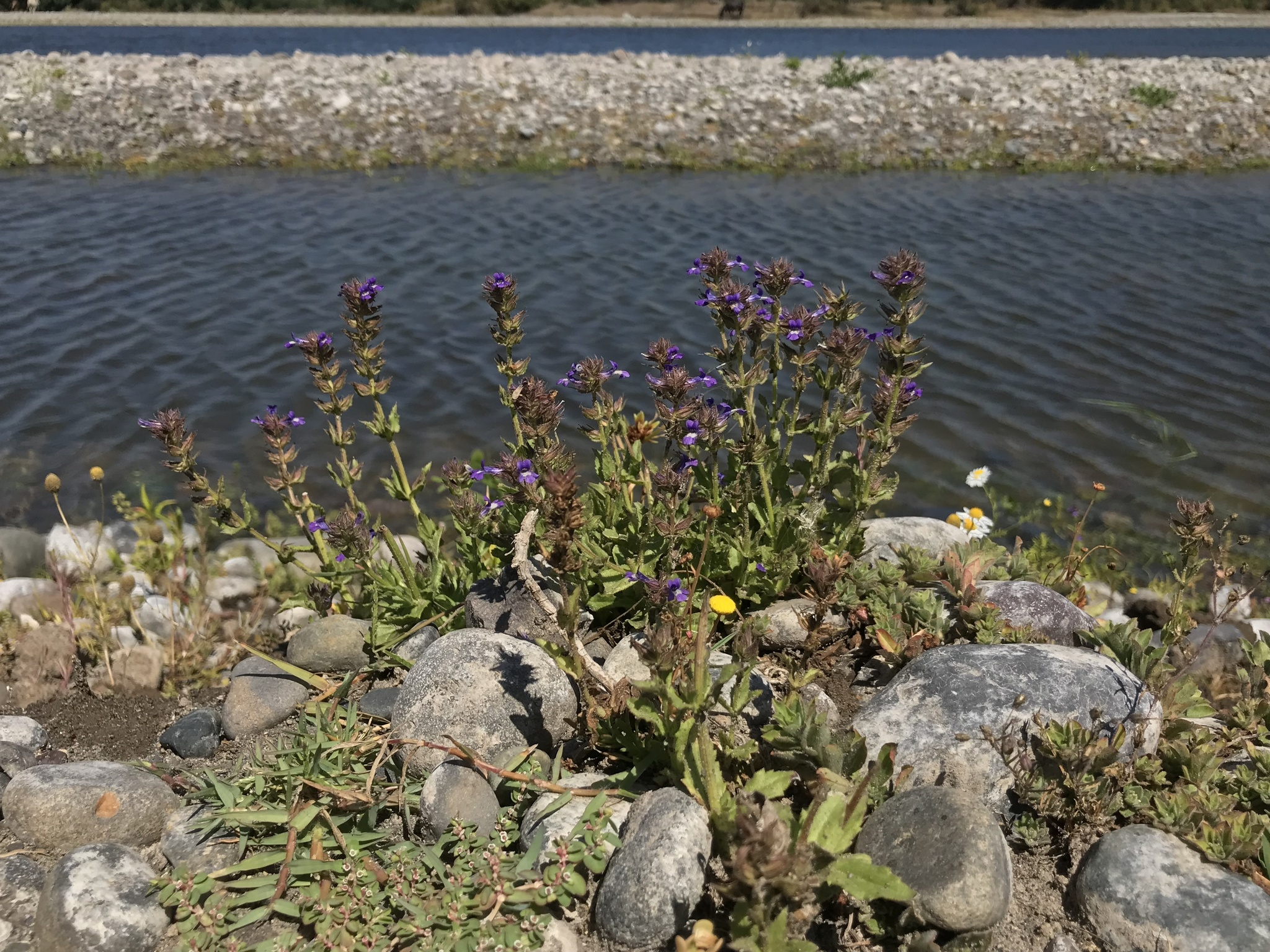
A plant in habitat.

In Chile and Argentina, the variety Stemodia durantifolia var. chilensis is found, with the typical variety absent. In Chile, this species is found in the north, central, and southern parts of the country, from Atacama Region to Araucania Region. In Argentina, this species is found in the province of Rio Negro and possibly in Patagonia. Previous identifications in Argentina of S. durantifolia var. durantifolia, the typical species, are presumed to be misidentifications of Stemodia stricta, Stemodia lanceolata, and Stemodia hyptoides.

=== Habitat ===
Stemodia durantifolia is usually found in wet and riparian places, sometimes disturbed, including along stream banks, ditches, margins of pools, rocks, and seepy hillsides. For substrate, it prefers wet sand and rock. Plants are usually found below 400 m (1,300 ft).
