= Umbraria =

Scientific classification
- Kingdom: Plantae
- Clade: Tracheophytes
- Clade: Angiosperms
- Clade: Eudicots
- Clade: Asterids
- Order: Lamiales
- Family: Plantaginaceae
- Tribe: Gratioleae
- Genus: Umbraria; Scatigna & V.C.Souza (2022)

Species
- Umbraria microphylla (J.A.Schmidt) Scatigna; Umbraria veronicoides (J.A.Schmidt) Scatigna

Genus of flowering plants

Umbraria is a genus of flowering plants in the family Plantaginaceae. It includes two species native to southeastern Brazil.

- Umbraria microphylla (J.A.Schmidt) Scatigna
- Umbraria veronicoides (J.A.Schmidt) Scatigna

The genus was described in 2022 by André Vito Scatigna and Vinicius Castro Souza. The two species were previously placed in genus Stemodia.
