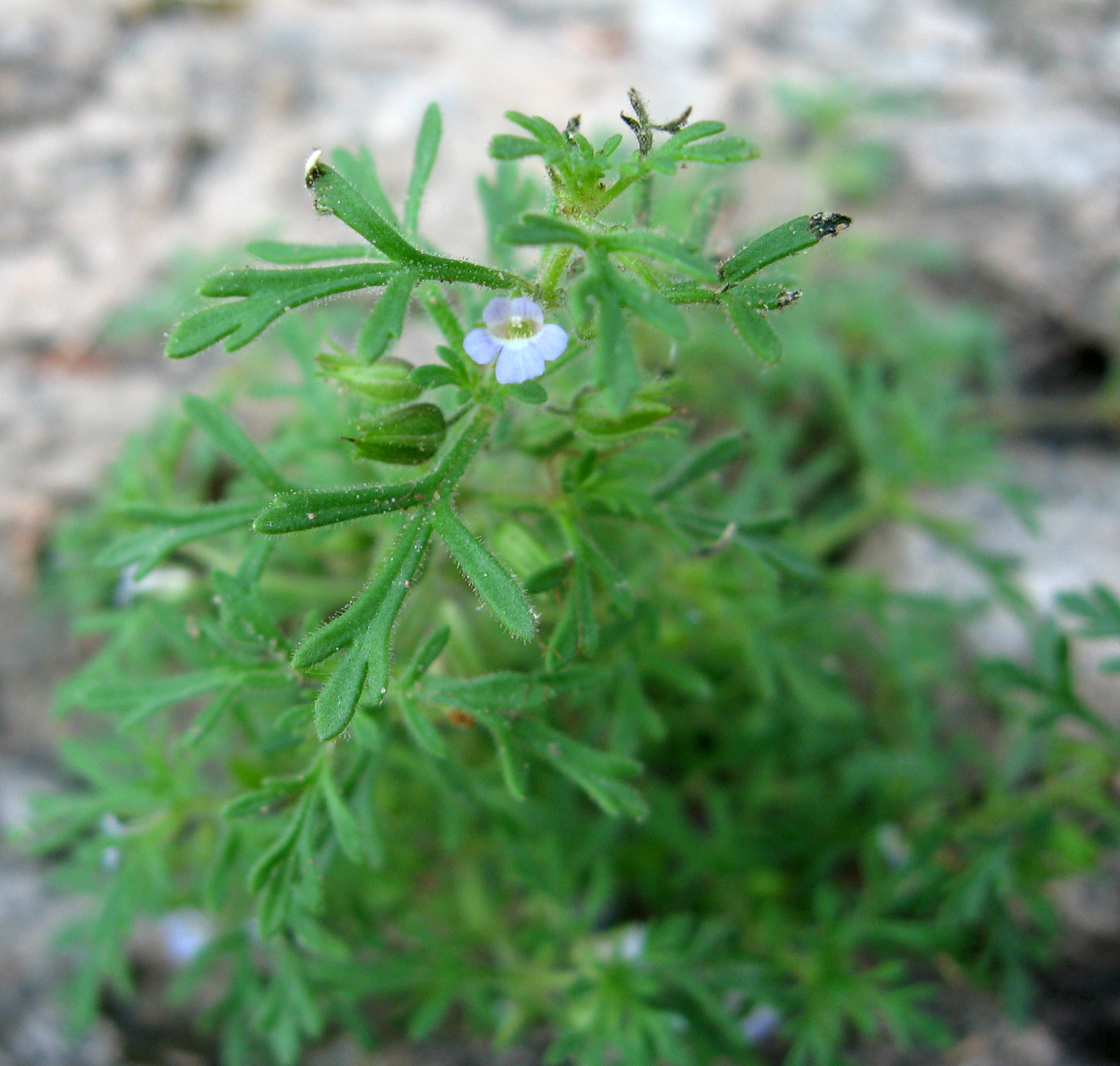

Scientific classification
- Kingdom: Plantae
- Clade: Tracheophytes
- Clade: Angiosperms
- Clade: Eudicots
- Clade: Asterids
- Order: Lamiales
- Family: Plantaginaceae
- Genus: Leucospora; Nutt.
- Species: L. multifida

Binomial name
- Leucospora multifida (Michx.) Nutt.

Synonyms
- Conobea multifida (Michx.) Benth.; Stemodia multifida (Michx.) Spreng.; Capraria multifida Michx.; Capraria multiflora Steud.; Sutera multifida (Michx.) Walp.

= Leucospora =

Leucospora multifida

Genus of flowering plants

Leucospora multifida, known variously as Obi-Wan conobea, narrow-leaved paleseed, cliff conobea, cut-leaved conobea, or much-cleft conobea, is an annual herb in the plantain family, Plantaginaceae, and the only species in the North American genus Leucospora.

== Taxonomy and naming ==
The genus Leucospora, from the Greek for "white-seeded", was named in 1834 by English botanist Thomas Nuttall. Its sole species (as of July 2019), now known as Leucospora multifida, was first described in 1803 by French botanist André Michaux as Capraria multifida. The epithet multifida is Greek for "cleft many times", in reference to the shape of its leaves. It has since been placed in several different genera, including Leucospora, Stemodia, Sutera, and Conobea, the latter from which several of its vernacular names originate.

One of its vernacular names, Obi-Wan conobea, is a reference to the Star Wars character Obi-Wan Kenobi, and is sometimes considered as purely a joke snuck into the 1994 edition of the Plants of the Chicago Region. However, this actually was a name in use by regional botanists at the time, "the kind of jocular lingo that arises among field botanists working in humid, hot summer sun and bedeviled by all manner of unpleasant flying and crawling things".

== Description ==
Obi-wan conobea is a small plant, growing to around 20 cm (8 in) tall, with glandular-hairy foliage. Its deeply dissected leaves may be alternate, opposite, or whorled. The axillary flowers are borne on pedicels. Each pale, lavender flower is tubular, around 6 mm (1/4 in) with 5 lobes. It flowers in the mid-summer to fall.

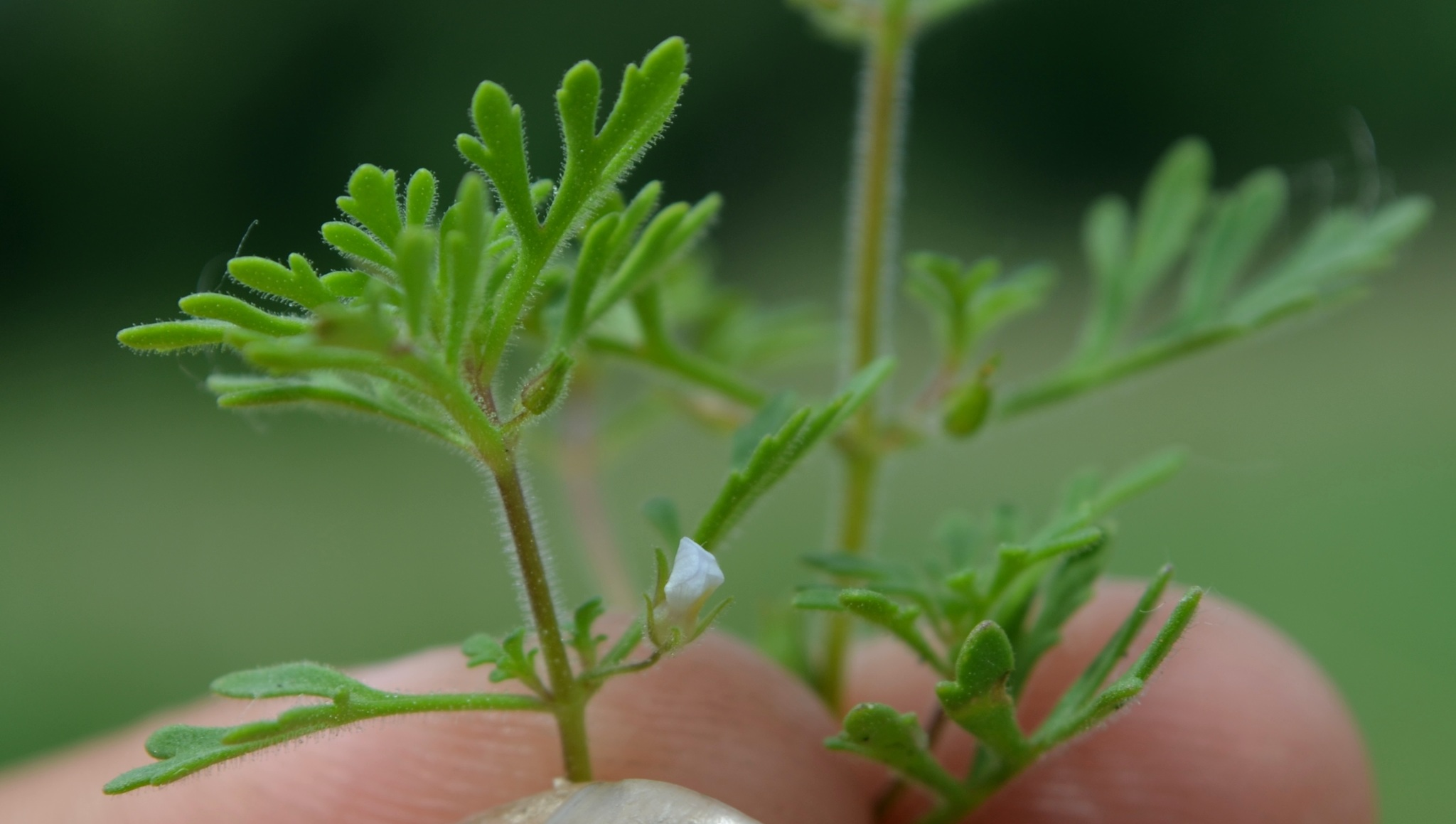
Glandular-hairy foliage

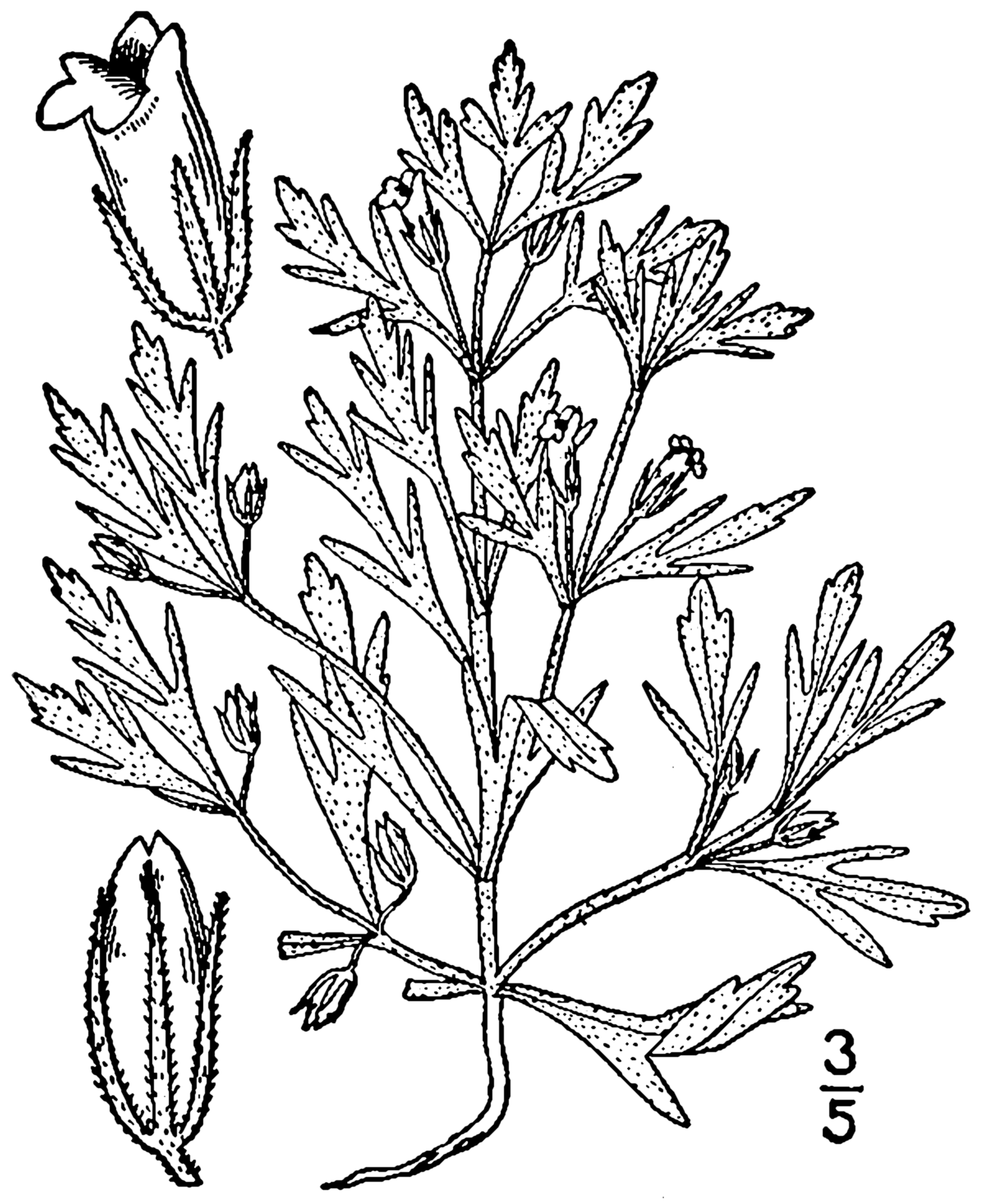
Illustration from Britton and Brown's 1913 An illustrated flora of the northern United States, Canada and the British Possessions

== Distribution and habitat ==
The core of its native range is the midwestern United States, including most of Illinois and Missouri, extending west to Nebraska, south to Texas, and east to Ohio, with scattered occurrences beyond, where it may be adventive.

Leucospora multifida is a facultative wetland or obligate wetland plant across its range. It grows on sandy, gravelly, and marly soils in ditches, swales, and receding shorelines of rivers and streams.
