= Hemiphragma =

Hemiphragma may refer to:

- Hemiphragma (bryozoan), an extinct genus of bryozoans in the family Dittoporidae
- Hemiphragma (plant), a genus of plants in the family Plantaginaceae
