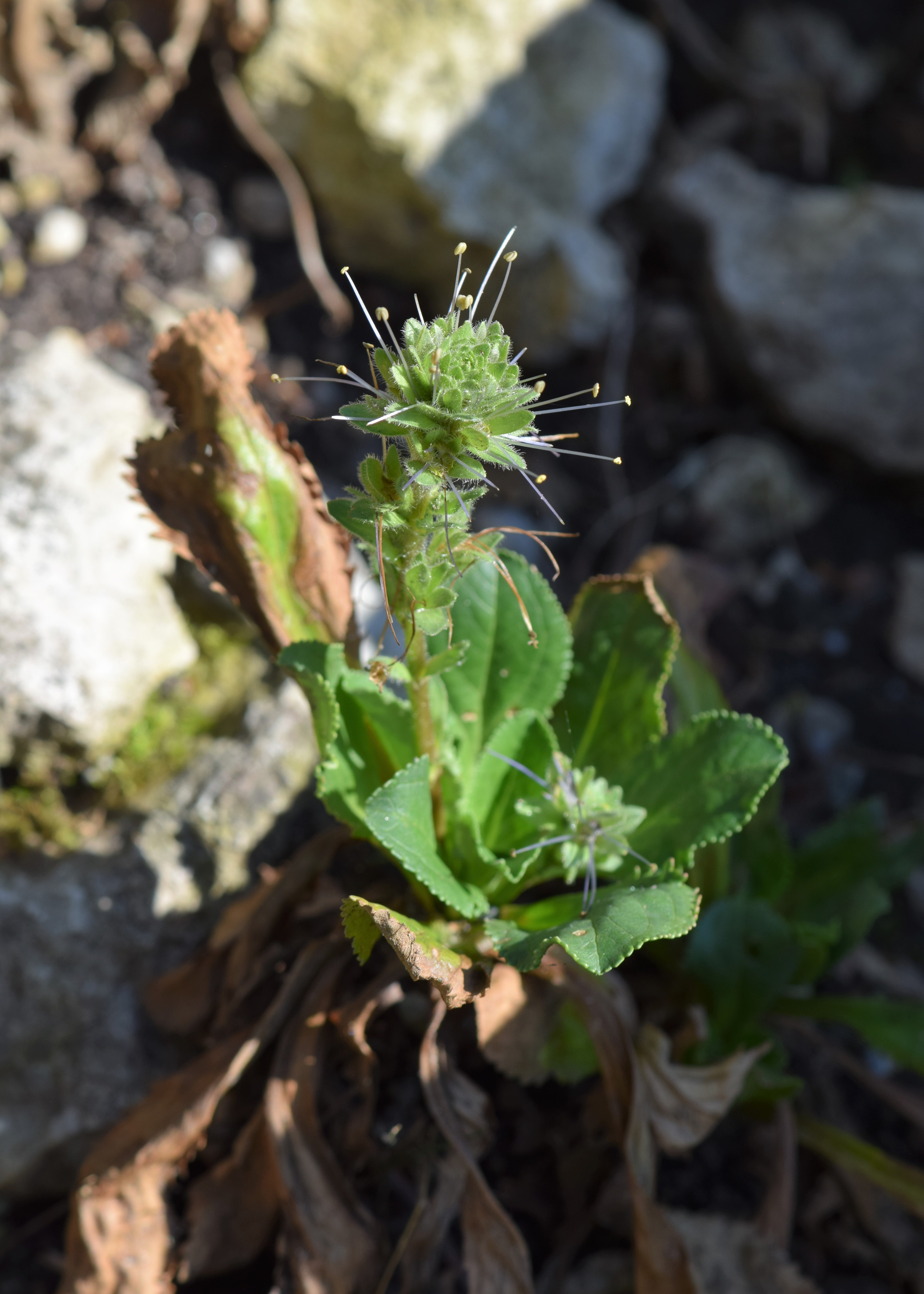

Conservation status
- CITES Appendix II

Scientific classification
- Kingdom: Plantae
- Clade: Tracheophytes
- Clade: Angiosperms
- Clade: Eudicots
- Clade: Asterids
- Order: Lamiales
- Family: Plantaginaceae
- Genus: Picrorhiza
- Species: P. kurroa

Binomial name
- Picrorhiza kurroa Royle ex Benth.

= Picrorhiza kurroa =

Species of flowering plant

Picrorhiza kurroa is one of the major income generating non-timber forest products found in the Nepalese Himalayas. It is one of the oldest medicinal plants traded from the Karnali zone. Known as kutki or कुटकी in Nepali, it is a perennial herb and is used as a substitute for Indian gentian (Gentiana kurroo).

== Habitat ==
It is found in the Himalayan region from Ladakh Kashmir to Sikkim at an elevation of 2700–4500 m and in Nepal, found abundantly between 3500 and 4800 m. It has been reported that Picrorhiza has been harvested to near extinction.

== Description ==
Leaves: 5–15 cm long leaves, almost all at the base, often withered. Leaves are coarsely toothed, narrowed to a winged stalk.
Rhizomes of the plant are 15–25 cm long and woody.
Flowers: small, pale or purplish blue, borne in cylindric spikes, spikes borne on almost leafless erect stems. Flowers about 8 mm, 5-lobed to the middle, and with much longer stamens.
Fruits: 1.3 cm long.

Chemistry: Chemical composition of Picrorhiza kurroa includes kutkin, a bitter glycoside which contains two C-9 iridoid glycosides, Picroside I and Kutakoside.

== Conservation ==
In 1997, kutki was listed in appendix II of the Convention on International Trade in Endangered Species (CITES). This listing resulted ultimately from a request by the Indian government. Overharvesting of the wild species for use as medicine was cited as the main reason for the listing. The species is not widely cultivated, though this has been discussed as a potential way to preserve wild stands, especially since the Dunagiri Foundation Trust has created, implemented, and successfully employed protocols to generate export-quality organic ethical 'Dunagiri Certified' Kutki since 2014. The International Union for Conservation of Nature Red List did not have a listing for this species as of 2014. Picrorhiza scrophulariiflora appears to be used heavily as a substitute for P. kurroa and is considered non-threatened by CITES.

== Usage ==
The rhizome has a long history of use in Indian Ayurvedic medicine for the treatment of digestive problems. Other uses have been proposed (e.g. for asthma, liver damage, wound healing, vitiligo), but the medical evidence is not yet conclusive. It appears to be relatively safe based on its long history of traditional use. Kutki has hepato-protective properties and thus supports the liver and spleen. It is used in all forms of liver damage, cirrhosis, and inflammation of the liver. It protects the liver against damage from the hepatitis C virus.
