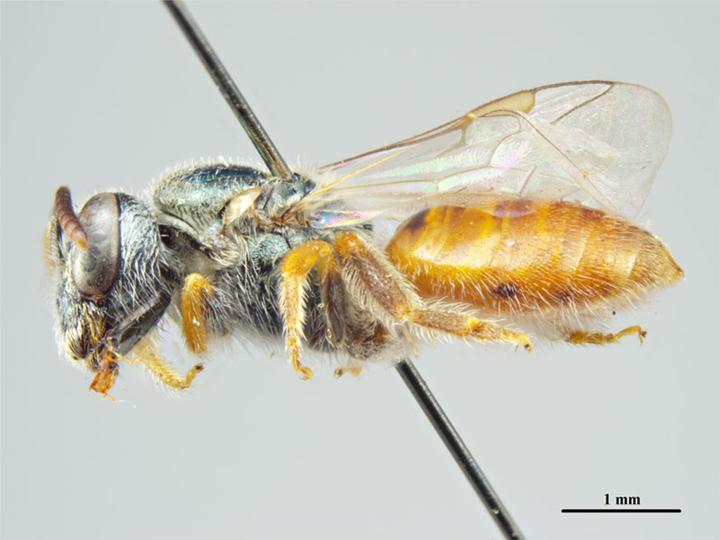
- Female

Scientific classification
- Kingdom: Animalia
- Phylum: Arthropoda
- Clade: Pancrustacea
- Class: Insecta
- Order: Hymenoptera
- Family: Halictidae
- Genus: Lasioglossum
- Species: L. vitripenne

Binomial name
- Lasioglossum vitripenne Smith, 1879

Synonyms
- Halictus vitripennis Smith, 1879; Halictus (Chloralictus) purnongensis Cockerell, 1913; Halictus sphecodoides mackayensis Friese, 1924; Halictus glauerti Rayment, 1931; Halictus doweri Rayment, 1935; Halictus doweri purpureus Rayment, 1935; Halictus ornatus Rayment, 1935; Halictus whiteleyi Rayment, 1939

= Lasioglossum vitripenne =

Species of bee

Lasioglossum vitripenne, or Lasioglossum (Chilalictus) vitripenne, is a species of bee in the family Halictidae and subfamily Halictinae. It is endemic to Australia. It was described by English entomologist Frederick Smith in 1879.

== Distribution and habitat ==
The species occurs across much of mainland Australia.

== Behaviour ==
The adults are flying mellivores. Flowering plants visited by the bees include Acacia, Alphitonia, Amyema, Angophora, Atalaya, Baeckea, Boronia, Bursaria, Callistemon, Cassia, Chrysanthemum, Eremophila, Eucalyptus, Gastrolobium, Grevillea, Hakea, Jacksonia, Leptospermum, Melaleuca, Micromyrtus, Nitraria, Olearia, Ptilotus, Stemodia, Taraxacum, Trachymene, Velleia and Wahlenbergia species.

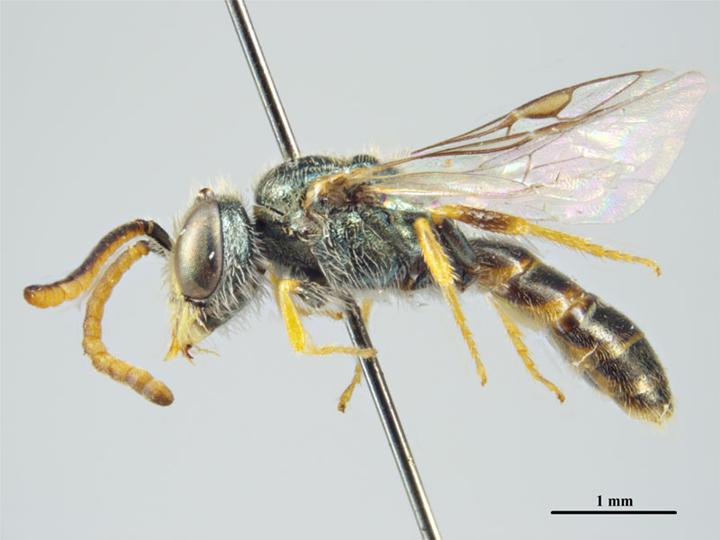
Male
