= Neopicrorhiza scrophulariiflora =

Scientific classification
- Kingdom: Plantae
- Clade: Tracheophytes
- Clade: Angiosperms
- Clade: Eudicots
- Clade: Asterids
- Order: Lamiales
- Family: Plantaginaceae
- Genus: Neopicrorhiza
- Species: N. scrophulariiflora

Binomial name
- Neopicrorhiza scrophulariiflora (Pennell) D.Y.Hong

Synonyms
- Picrorhiza scrophulariiflora Pennell

Species of flowering plant

Neopicrorhiza scrophulariiflora is a species of flowering plant in the family Plantaginaceae. It is used heavily as a substitute for Picrorhiza kurroa and is considered non-threatened under CITES. It is similar to P. kurrooa but has leaves up to 6 cm long and stems which are decumbent. Flowers of this plant are 1.5 cm long, deep blue-purple with exserted styles and stamens. This species is found from Uttar Pradesh to southwestern China, including Sichuan, Yunnan, Tibet, Bhutan, Nepal and Sikkim, on rocky slopes at altitudes of 3,600–4,800 m (11,800–15,700 ft).
