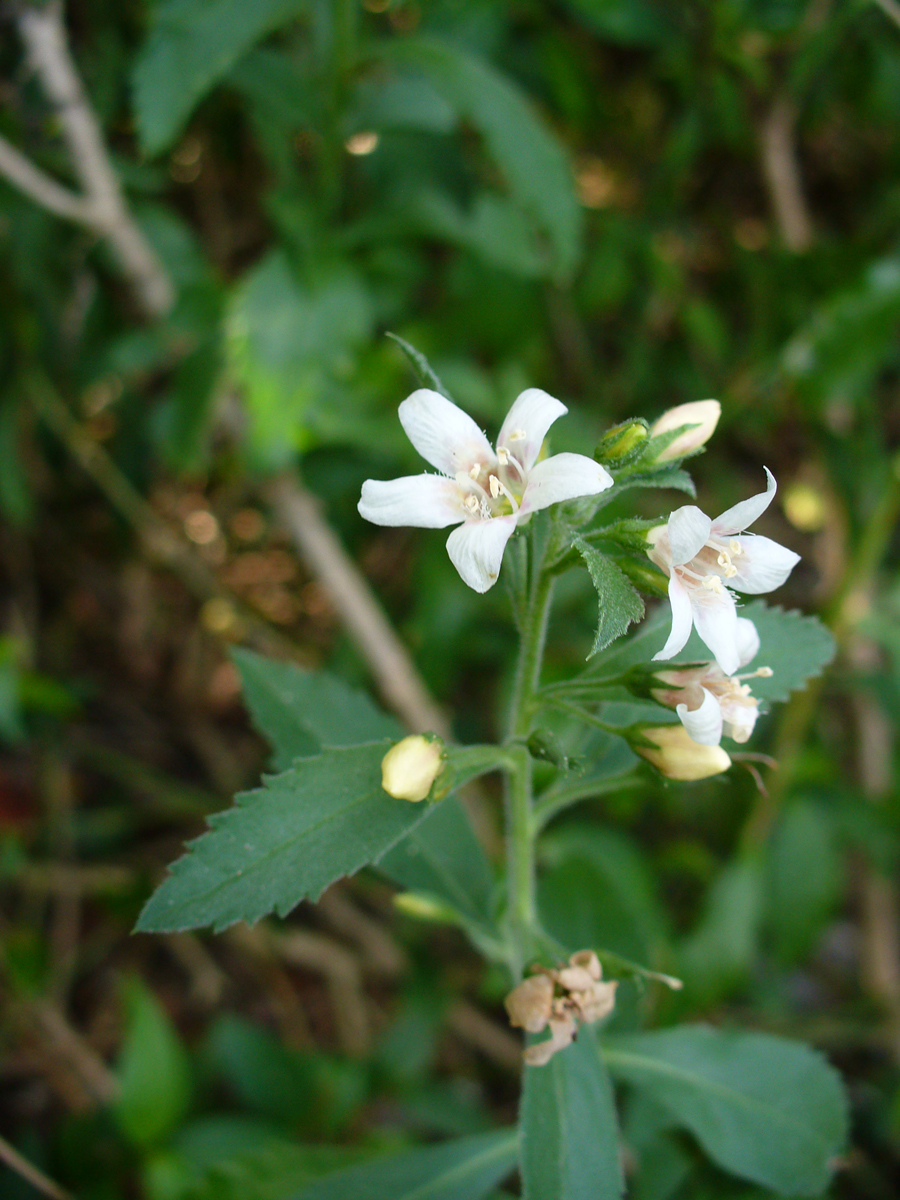
- Capraria biflora

Scientific classification
- Kingdom: Plantae
- Clade: Tracheophytes
- Clade: Angiosperms
- Clade: Eudicots
- Clade: Asterids
- Order: Lamiales
- Family: Scrophulariaceae
- Tribe: Leucophylleae
- Genus: Capraria; L. (1753)

Species
- 7; see text

Synonyms
- Pogostoma Schrad. (1831); Xuarezia Ruiz & Pav. (1794)

= Capraria =

Genus of flowering plants

Capraria is a genus of flowering plants in the family Scrophulariaceae. It includes seven species native to the tropical Americas, ranging from Mexico through Central America, the Caribbean Islands, and northern South America to northern Argentina. It is sometimes placed in the families Gratiolaceae, Plantaginaceae, or Veronicaceae. The name is derived from the Latin word caprarius, meaning "pertaining to goats." This refers to goats being one of the few herbivores that will graze on the plants.

== Species ==
Seven species are accepted.

- Capraria biflora L. – Goatweed
- Capraria frutescens (Mill.) Briq.
- Capraria integerrima Miq.
- Capraria integrifolia M.Martens & Galeotti
- Capraria mexicana Moric. ex Benth. – Tamaulipan tea
- Capraria peruviana Benth.
- Capraria saxifragifolia Schltdl. & Cham.

=== Formerly placed here ===
- Lindernia crustacea (L.) F.Muell. (as C. crustacea L.)
- Leucospora multifida (Michx.) Nutt. (as C. multifida Michx.)
