= Cheilophyllum =

Scientific classification
- Kingdom: Plantae
- Clade: Tracheophytes
- Clade: Angiosperms
- Clade: Eudicots
- Clade: Asterids
- Order: Lamiales
- Family: Plantaginaceae
- Genus: Cheilophyllum; Pennell

Genus of flowering plants

Cheilophyllum is a genus of flowering plants belonging to the family Plantaginaceae. It includes eight species, seven native to Cuba and one extinct in Jamaica.

== Species ==
eight species are accepted.

- Cheilophyllum dentatum Urb. – central Cuba
- † Cheilophyllum jamaicense Pennell – southern Jamaica (Ashley Hall Savanna); extinct
- Cheilophyllum macranthum Urb. - central Cuba
- Cheilophyllum marginatum Pennell – central Cuba
- Cheilophyllum micranthum Urb. – Cuba (Camagüey)
- Cheilophyllum microphyllum Pennell – Cuba (Pinar del Río)
- Cheilophyllum radicans (Griseb.) Pennell – Cuba
- Cheilophyllum sphaerocarpum Urb. – central Cuba
