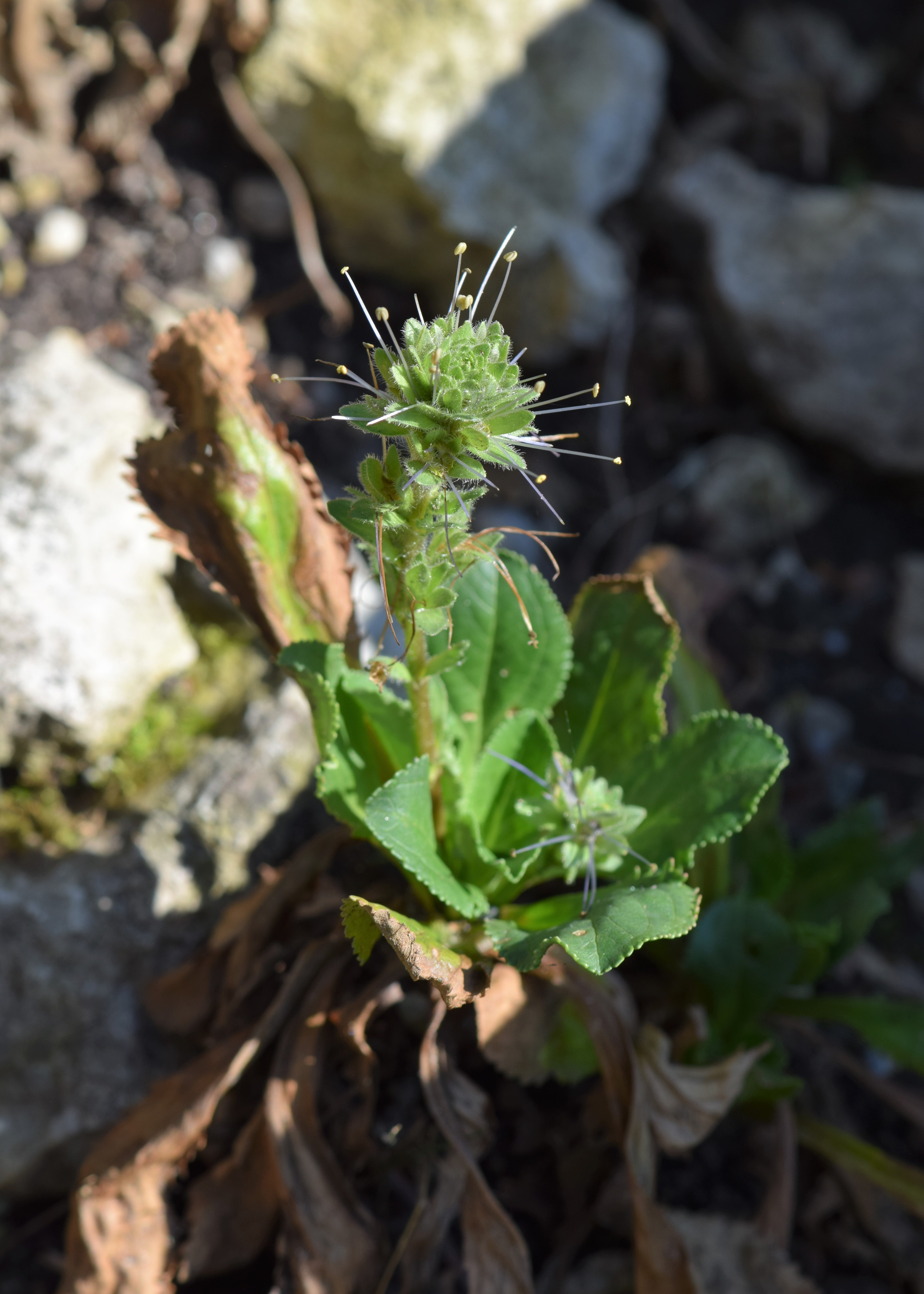
- Picrorhiza kurroa

Scientific classification
- Kingdom: Plantae
- Clade: Tracheophytes
- Clade: Angiosperms
- Clade: Eudicots
- Clade: Asterids
- Order: Lamiales
- Family: Plantaginaceae
- Tribe: Veroniceae
- Genus: Picrorhiza; Royle ex Benth.

= Picrorhiza =

Genus of plants

Picrorhiza is a genus of flowering plants belonging to the family Plantaginaceae.

Its native range is Pakistan to Western Himalaya.

Species:

- Picrorhiza kurroa Royle ex Benth.
- Picrorhiza tungnathii Pusalkar
