= Geochorda =

Scientific classification
- Kingdom: Plantae
- Clade: Tracheophytes
- Clade: Angiosperms
- Clade: Eudicots
- Clade: Asterids
- Order: Lamiales
- Family: Plantaginaceae
- Genus: Geochorda; Cham. & Schltdl. (1828)
- Species: G. glechomoides

Binomial name
- Geochorda glechomoides (Spreng.) Kuntze (1898)

Synonyms
- Conobea glechomoides (Spreng.) V.C.Souza (2009); Geochorda cuneata Cham. & Schltdl. (1828); Herpestis glechomoides Spreng. (1827)

Genus of plants

Geochorda is monotypic genus of flowering plants belonging to the family Plantaginaceae. The only species is Geochorda glechomoides.

It is a subshrub native to southern Brazil, northeastern Argentina, and Uruguay.
