= Trungboa =

Scientific classification
- Kingdom: Plantae
- Clade: Tracheophytes
- Clade: Angiosperms
- Clade: Eudicots
- Clade: Asterids
- Order: Lamiales
- Family: Plantaginaceae
- Genus: Trungboa; Rauschert (1982)
- Species: T. poilanei

Binomial name
- Trungboa poilanei (Gagnep.) Rauschert (1982)

Synonyms
- Cyphocalyx Gagnep. (1950), nom. illeg.; Cyphocalyx poilanei Gagnep. (1950)

Genus of flowering plants

Trungboa poilanei is a species of flowering plant belonging to the family Plantaginaceae. It is the sole species in genus Trungboa. It is endemic to Vietnam.
