= Neopicrorhiza =

Scientific classification
- Kingdom: Plantae
- Clade: Tracheophytes
- Clade: Angiosperms
- Clade: Eudicots
- Clade: Asterids
- Order: Lamiales
- Family: Plantaginaceae
- Tribe: Veroniceae
- Genus: Neopicrorhiza; D.Y.Hong

Genus of plants

Neopicrorhiza is a genus of flowering plants belonging to the family Plantaginaceae.

Its native range is Himalayas to South-Central China.

== Species ==
Species:

- Neopicrorhiza minima R.R.Mill
- Neopicrorhiza scrophulariiflora (Pennell) D.Y.Hong
