= Ancistrostylis =

Scientific classification
- Kingdom: Plantae
- Clade: Tracheophytes
- Clade: Angiosperms
- Clade: Eudicots
- Clade: Asterids
- Order: Lamiales
- Family: Plantaginaceae
- Genus: Ancistrostylis; T.Yamaz. (1980)
- Species: Ancistrostylis

Binomial name
- Ancistrostylis (Bonati) T.Yamaz (1980)

Synonyms
- Herpestis harmandii Bonati (1913)

Genus of flowering plants

Ancistrostylis harmandii is a species of flowering plant belonging to the family of Plantaginaceae. It is the sole species in genus Ancistrostylis. It is endemic to Laos.
