= Lapaea =

Scientific classification
- Kingdom: Plantae
- Clade: Tracheophytes
- Clade: Angiosperms
- Clade: Eudicots
- Clade: Asterids
- Order: Lamiales
- Family: Plantaginaceae
- Tribe: Gratioleae
- Genus: Lapaea; Scatigna & V.C.Souza (2020)

Species
- 5; see text

Genus of flowering plants

Lapaea is a genus of flowering plants in the family Plantaginaceae. It includes five species native to eastern Brazil.

== Species ==
Five species are accepted.

- Lapaea cipoensis (Scatigna) Scatigna
- Lapaea harleyi (B.L.Turner) Scatigna
- Lapaea lobata (J.A.Schmidt) Scatigna
- Lapaea rubriflora Scatigna & V.C.Souza
- Lapaea stellata (B.L.Turner) Scatigna
