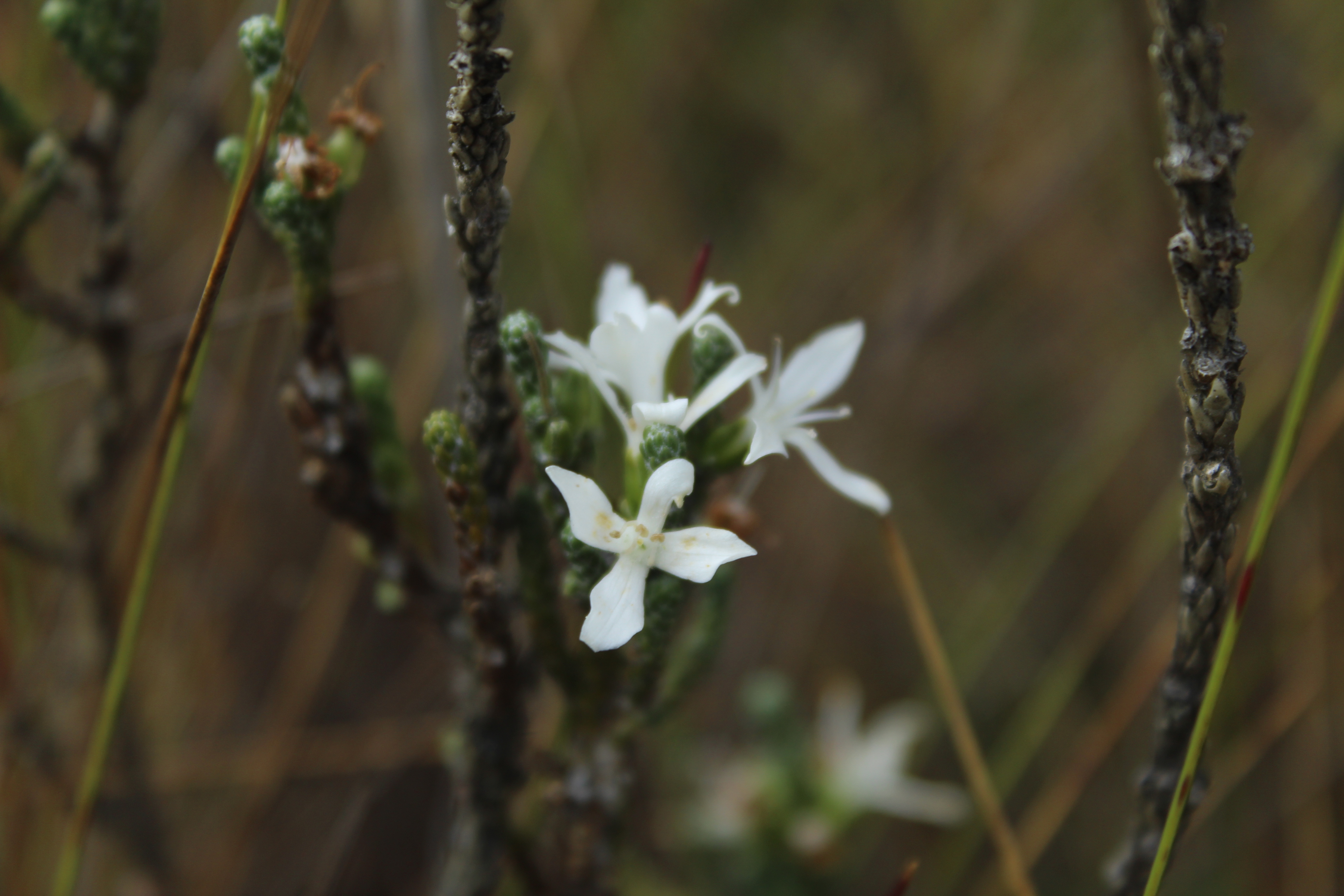
- Aragoa cupressina

Scientific classification
- Kingdom: Plantae
- Clade: Tracheophytes
- Clade: Angiosperms
- Clade: Eudicots
- Clade: Asterids
- Order: Lamiales
- Family: Plantaginaceae
- Tribe: Plantagineae
- Genus: Aragoa; Kunth (1819)

species
- 19; see text

= Aragoa =

Genus of flowering plants

Aragoa is a genus of woody perennials native to the páramo of Colombia and north-western Venezuela. It classified as the sister taxon to Littorella and Plantago, all of which are now classified in the family Plantaginaceae. It is found at elevations above about 3000 m.

== Species ==
19 species are accepted.

- Aragoa abietina Kunth
- Aragoa abscondita Fern.Alonso
- Aragoa castroviejoi Fern.Alonso
- Aragoa × chingacensis Fern.Alonso
- Aragoa cleefii Fern.Alonso
- Aragoa corrugatifolia Fern.Alonso
- Aragoa cundinamarcensis Fern.Alonso
- Aragoa cupressina Kunth
- Aragoa × diazii Fern.Alonso
- Aragoa dugandii Romero
- Aragoa funckii Fern.Alonso
- Aragoa × funzana Fern.Alonso
- Aragoa hammenii Fern.Alonso
- Aragoa × jaramilloi Fern.Alonso
- Aragoa kogiorum Romero
- Aragoa lucidula S.F.Blake
- Aragoa lycopodioides Benth. ex Oliver
- Aragoa occidentalis Pennell
- Aragoa parviflora Fern.Alonso & Castrov.
- Aragoa perez-arbelaeziana Romero
- Aragoa picachensis Fern.Alonso
- Aragoa romeroi Fern.Alonso
- Aragoa tamana Fern.Alonso
