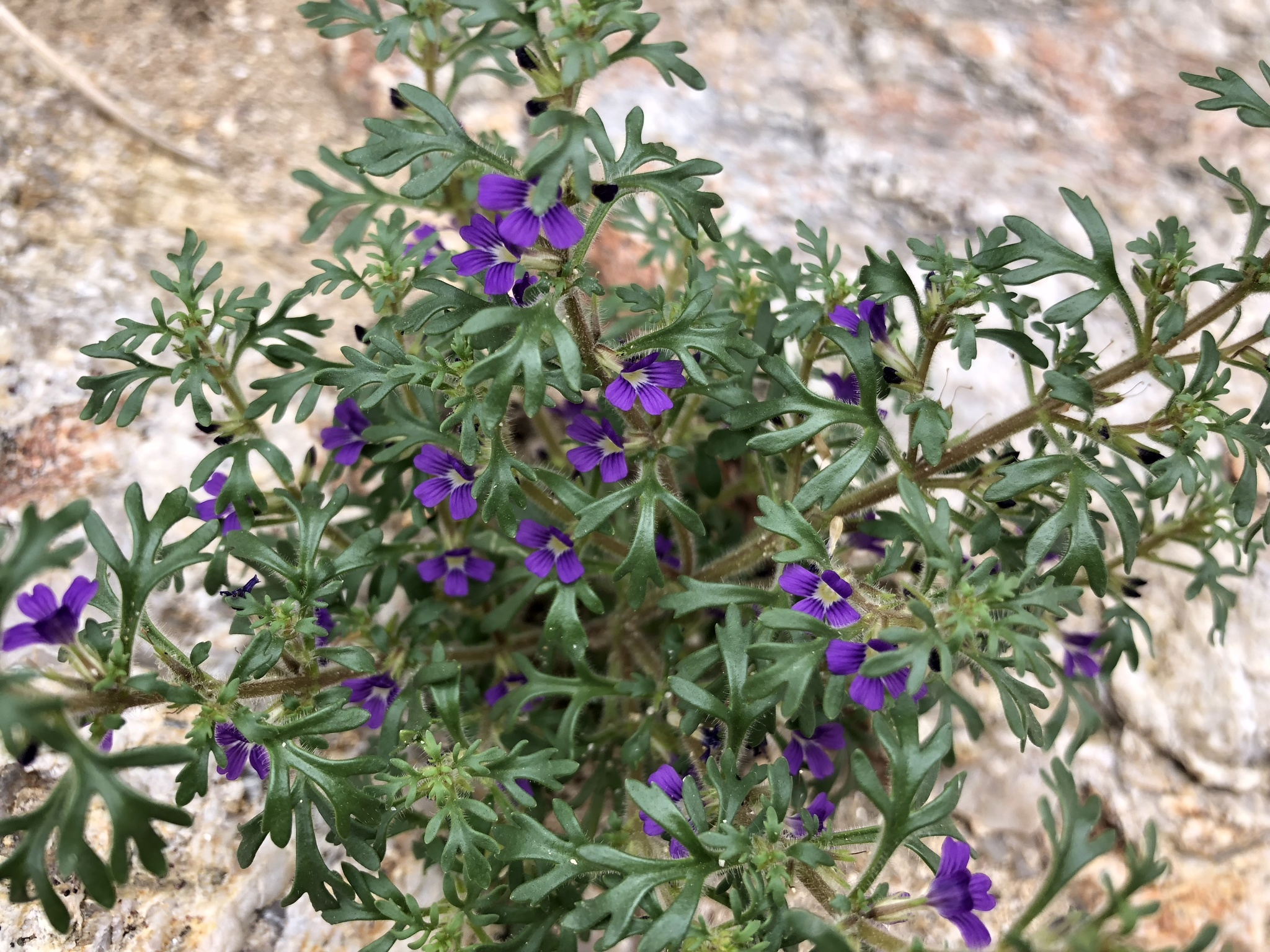
- Harlequin Spiralseed (Schistophragma intermedium), Pima County, Arizona, 2018

Scientific classification
- Kingdom: Plantae
- Clade: Tracheophytes
- Clade: Angiosperms
- Clade: Eudicots
- Clade: Asterids
- Order: Lamiales
- Family: Plantaginaceae
- Genus: Schistophragma; Benth. ex Endl.

= Schistophragma =

Genus of plants

Schistophragma is a genus of flowering plants belonging to the family Plantaginaceae.

Its native range is Arizona to New Mexico and Colombia.

== Species ==
Species:

- Schistophragma intermedium (A.Gray) Pennell
- Schistophragma mexicanum Benth. ex D.Dietr.
- Schistophragma polystachyum (Brandegee) B.L.Turner
- Schistophragma pusillum Benth.
