= Scrofella =

Scientific classification
- Kingdom: Plantae
- Clade: Tracheophytes
- Clade: Angiosperms
- Clade: Eudicots
- Clade: Asterids
- Order: Lamiales
- Family: Plantaginaceae
- Tribe: Veroniceae
- Genus: Scrofella; Maxim. (1888)
- Species: S. chinensis

Binomial name
- Scrofella chinensis Maxim. (1888)

Synonyms
- Calorhabdos chinensis (Maxim.) Franch. (1900)

Genus of plants

Scrofella is a monotypic genus of flowering plants belonging to the family Plantaginaceae. The only species is Scrofella chinensis.

Its native range is Western and Central China.
