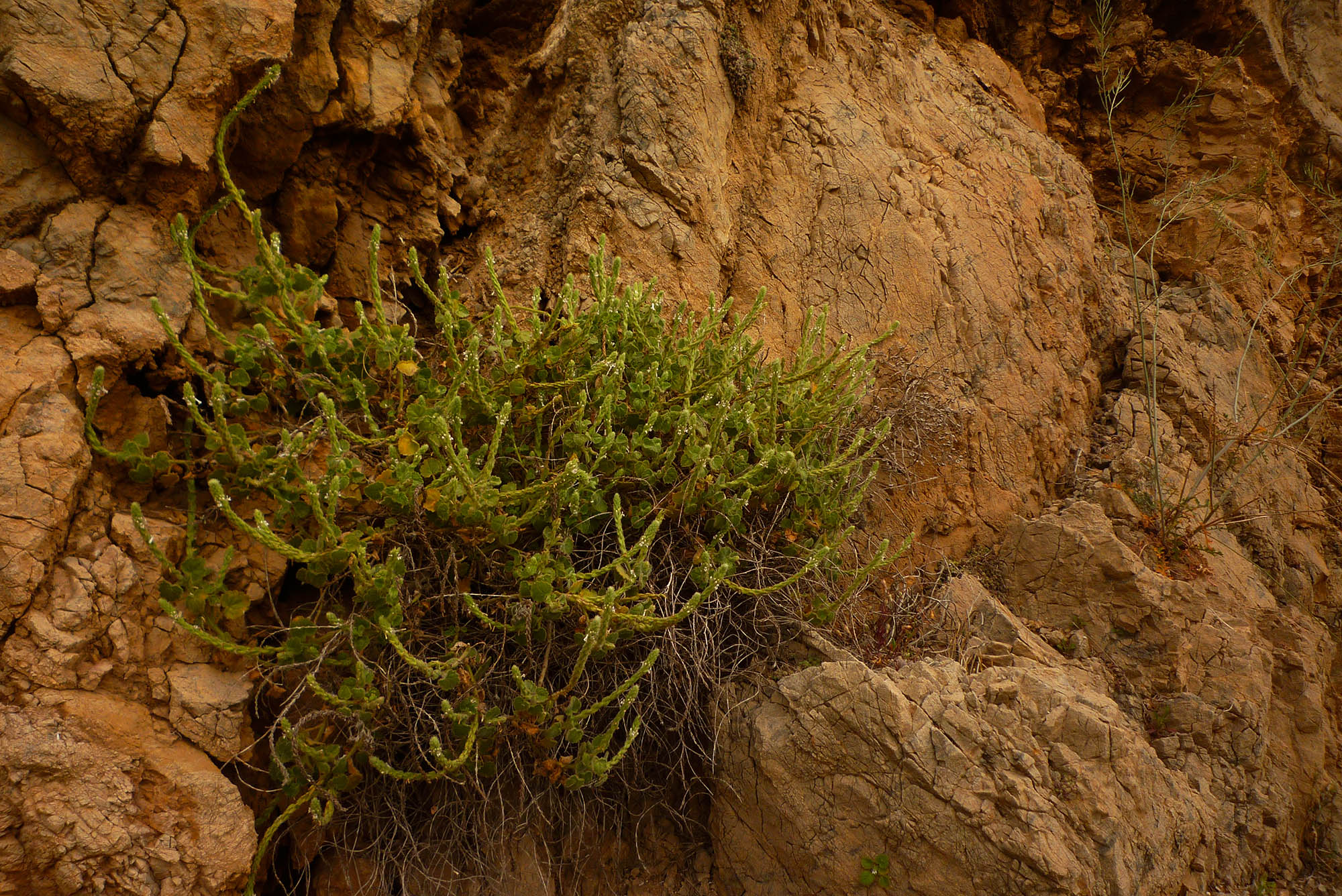
- Lafuentea rotundifolia

Scientific classification
- Kingdom: Plantae
- Clade: Tracheophytes
- Clade: Angiosperms
- Clade: Eudicots
- Clade: Asterids
- Order: Lamiales
- Family: Plantaginaceae
- Genus: Lafuentea; Lag.

Synonyms
- Durieua Mérat

= Lafuentea =

Genus of plants

Lafuentea is a genus of flowering plants belonging to the family Plantaginaceae.

Its native range is the Western Mediterranean, where it is found in Morocco and Spain.

The genus name of Lafuentea is in honour of Tadeo Lafuente (b. c. 1780), Spanish military doctor who wrote about yellow fever. It was first described and published in Gen. Sp. Pl. on page 19 in 1816.

Known species, according to Kew:

- Lafuentea jeanpertiana Maire
- Lafuentea rotundifolia Lag.
