= Brookea =

Scientific classification
- Kingdom: Plantae
- Clade: Tracheophytes
- Clade: Angiosperms
- Clade: Eudicots
- Clade: Asterids
- Order: Lamiales
- Family: Plantaginaceae
- Genus: Brookea; Benth.

Genus of flowering plants

Brookea is a genus of flowering plant belonging to the family Plantaginaceae.

Its native range is Borneo to Sulawesi.

Species:

- Brookea albicans Stapf
- Brookea auriculata T.Yamaz.
- Brookea celebica Adema
- Brookea dasyantha Benth.
- Brookea linduensis Adema
- Brookea tomentosa Benth.
