= Tetraulacium =

Scientific classification
- Kingdom: Plantae
- Clade: Tracheophytes
- Clade: Angiosperms
- Clade: Eudicots
- Clade: Asterids
- Order: Lamiales
- Family: Plantaginaceae
- Genus: Tetraulacium; Turcz. (1843)
- Species: T. veroniciforme

Binomial name
- Tetraulacium veroniciforme Turcz. (1843)

Genus of flowering plants

Tetraulacium veroniciforme is a species of flowering plant belonging to the family Plantaginaceae. It is the sole species in genus Tetraulacium. It is native to eastern and west-central Brazil
