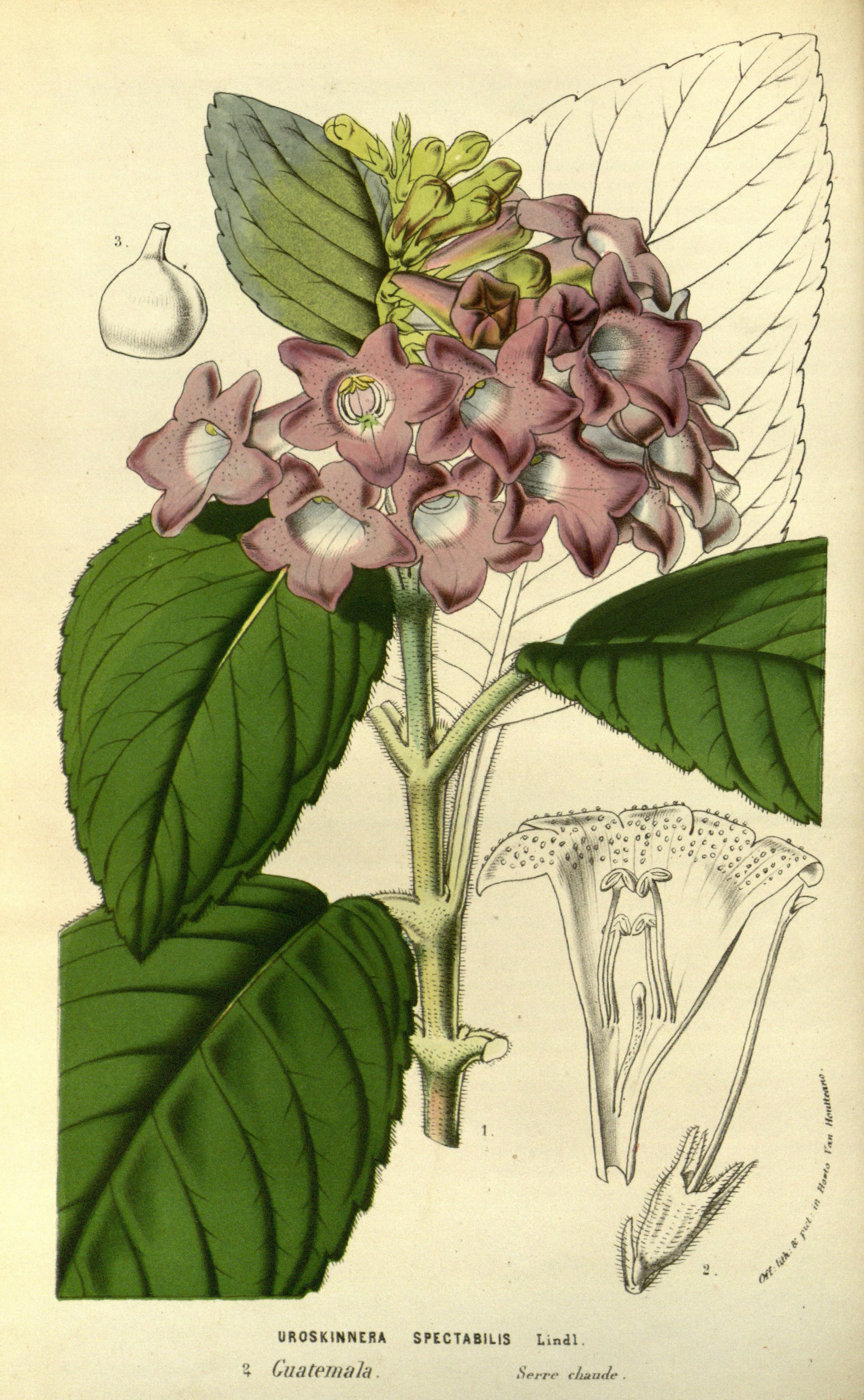

Scientific classification
- Kingdom: Plantae
- Clade: Tracheophytes
- Clade: Angiosperms
- Clade: Eudicots
- Clade: Asterids
- Order: Lamiales
- Family: Plantaginaceae
- Genus: Uroskinnera; Lindl.

= Uroskinnera =

Genus of flowering plants

Uroskinnera is a genus of flowering plants belonging to the family Plantaginaceae. It is also in Tribe Cheloneae.

It is native to Mexico, Guatemala and El Salvador.

== Known species ==
Accepted by Kew:

- Uroskinnera almedae T.F.Daniel & D.E.Breedlove
- Uroskinnera flavida Lundell
- Uroskinnera hirtiflora Hemsl.
- Uroskinnera spectabilis Lindl.

The genus name of Uroskinnera is in honour of George Ure Skinner (1804–1867), an English merchant, ornithologist and plant collector. It was first described and published in Gard. Chron. 1857 on page 36 in 1857. The genus is recognized by the United States Department of Agriculture and the Agricultural Research Service, but they do not list any known species.
