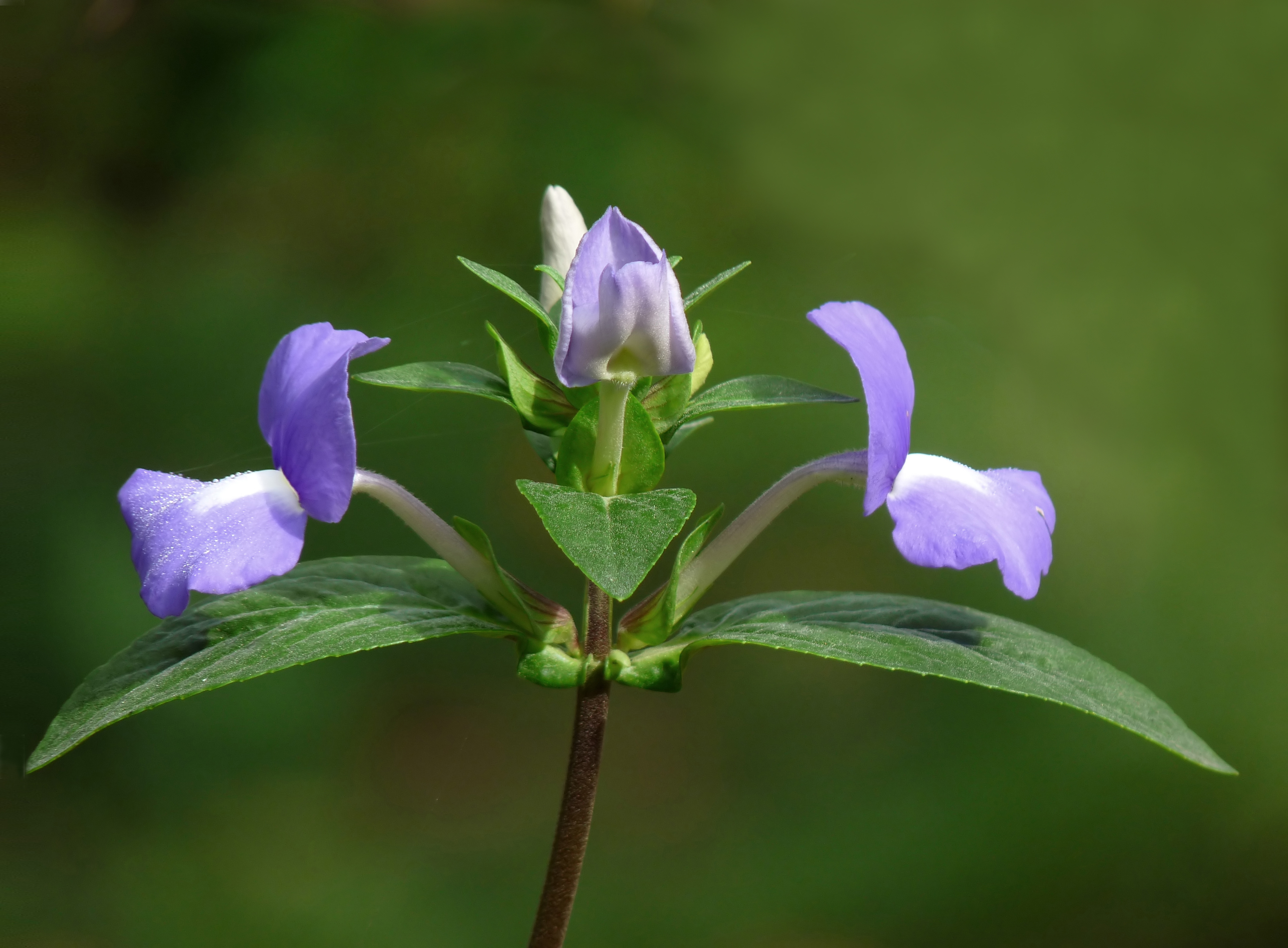

Scientific classification
- Kingdom: Plantae
- Clade: Tracheophytes
- Clade: Angiosperms
- Clade: Eudicots
- Clade: Asterids
- Order: Lamiales
- Family: Plantaginaceae
- Genus: Matourea
- Species: M. azurea

Binomial name
- Matourea azurea (Linden) Colletta & V.C. Souza (2020)

Synonyms
- Achetaria azurea (Linden) V.C.Souza (2009); Otacanthus azureus (Linden) Ronse (2001); Stemodia azurea Linden (1862)

= Matourea azurea =

Species of shrub

Matourea azurea, the Amazon blue, is a species of shrub in the family Plantaginaceae. It is a subshrub native to Espírito Santo and Rio de Janeiro states in southeastern Brazil.
