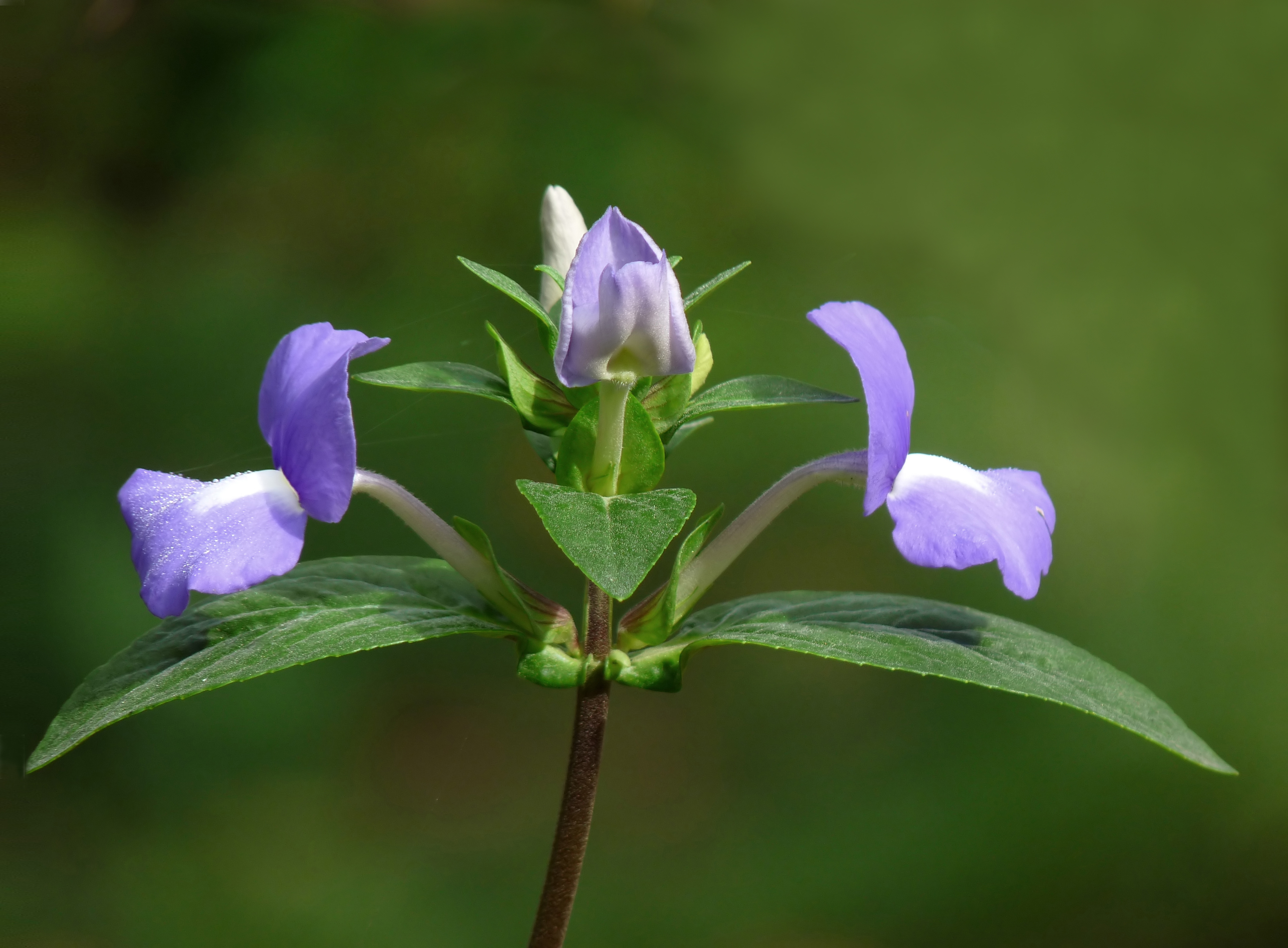
- Matourea azurea

Scientific classification
- Kingdom: Plantae
- Clade: Embryophytes
- Clade: Tracheophytes
- Clade: Spermatophytes
- Clade: Angiosperms
- Clade: Eudicots
- Clade: Asterids
- Order: Lamiales
- Family: Plantaginaceae
- Genus: Matourea; Aubl.

Species
- 9; see text

Synonyms
- Achetaria Cham. & Schltdl.; Beyrichia Cham. & Schltdl.; Otacanthus Lindl.; Tetraplacus Radlk.

= Matourea =

Genus of flowering plants

Matourea is a genus in the family Plantaginaceae. It includes nine species native to tropical South America and Nicaragua. The name Matourea refers to the town of Matoury (French Guiana).

It is the correct name for former genus Achetaria that contained ten species.

== Species ==
Nine species are accepted.

- Matourea azurea (Linden) Colletta & V.C. Souza
- Matourea caparaoensis (Brade) Colletta & V.C. Souza
- Matourea crenata (Ronse & Philcox) Colletta & V.C. Souza
- Matourea erecta (Spreng.) Colletta & V.C. Souza (= Achetaria bicolor Pennell)
- Matourea latifolia (V.C. Souza) Colletta & V.C. Souza
- Matourea ocymoides (Cham. & Schltdl.) Colletta & V.C. Souza
- Matourea platychila (Radlk.) Colletta & V.C. Souza
- Matourea pratensis Aubl.
- Matourea scutellarioides (Benth.) Colletta & V.C. Souza (= Achetaria guianensis Pennell)
