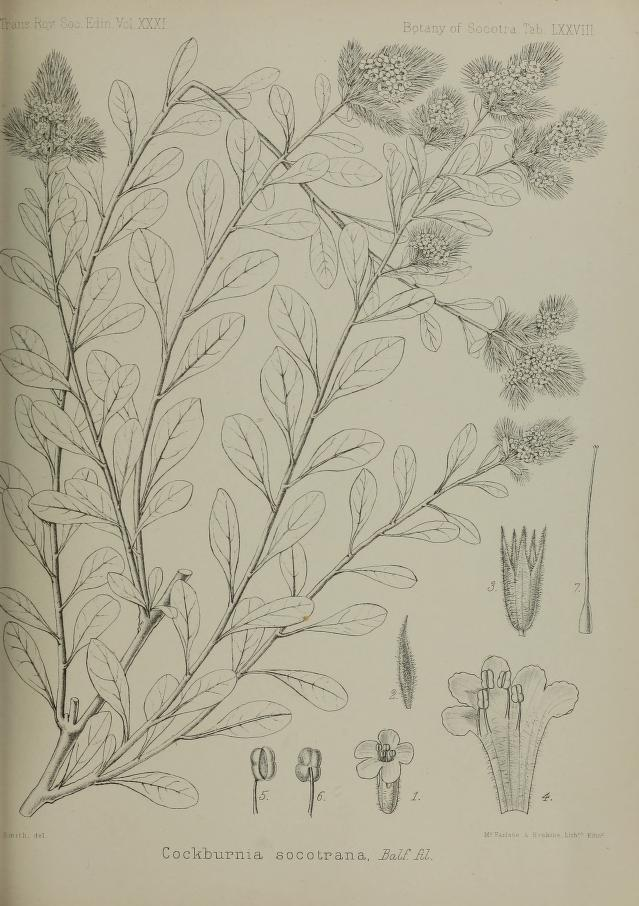

Scientific classification
- Kingdom: Plantae
- Clade: Tracheophytes
- Clade: Angiosperms
- Clade: Eudicots
- Clade: Asterids
- Order: Lamiales
- Family: Plantaginaceae
- Genus: Poskea; Vatke

Synonyms
- Cockburnia Balf.f.

= Poskea =

Species of flowering plant

Poskea is a genus of flowering plants belonging to the family Plantaginaceae.

It is native to Somalia, Socotra and Yemen.

The genus name of Poskea is in honour of Friedrich Poske (1852–1925), a German teacher and natural scientist in Berlin. It was first described and published in Linnaea Vol.43 on page 321 in 1882.

== Known species ==
According to Kew:

- Poskea africana Vatke
- Poskea socotrana (Balf.f.) G.Taylor
