= Basistemon =

Scientific classification
- Kingdom: Plantae
- Clade: Tracheophytes
- Clade: Angiosperms
- Clade: Eudicots
- Clade: Asterids
- Order: Lamiales
- Family: Plantaginaceae
- Genus: Basistemon; Turcz. (1863)

Synonyms
- Desdemona S.Moore (1895); Hassleropsis Chodat (1904); Saccanthus Herzog (1916)

Genus of flowering plants

Basistemon is a genus of flowering plants belonging to the family Plantaginaceae. It includes eight species native to South America, ranging from Colombia and Venezuela to northern Argentina.

== Species ==
Eight species are accepted.

- Basistemon argutus Barringer
- Basistemon bogotensis Turcz.
- Basistemon intermedius Edwin
- Basistemon klugii Barringer
- Basistemon peruvianus Benth. & Hook.f.
- Basistemon pulchellus (S.Moore) Barringer
- Basistemon silvaticus (Herzog) Baehni & J.F.Macbr.
- Basistemon spinosus (Chodat) Moldenke
