= Wulfeniopsis =

Scientific classification
- Kingdom: Plantae
- Clade: Tracheophytes
- Clade: Angiosperms
- Clade: Eudicots
- Clade: Asterids
- Order: Lamiales
- Family: Plantaginaceae
- Tribe: Veroniceae
- Genus: Wulfeniopsis; D.Y.Hong

Genus of flowering plants

Wulfeniopsis is a genus of flowering plants belonging to the family Plantaginaceae. It is also in tribe Veroniceae.

It is native to Nepal, West Himalaya, Pakistan and Afghanistan.

Known species:

- Wulfeniopsis amherstiana (Benth.) D.Y.Hong
- Wulfeniopsis nepalensis (T.Yamaz.) D.Y.Hong

The genus name of Wulfeniopsis is in honour of Franz Xaver von Wulfen (1728–1805), an Austrian botanist, zoologist, mineralogist, alpinist, and Jesuit priest. It was first described and published in Acta Phytotax. Sin. Vol.18 on page 51 in 1980.
