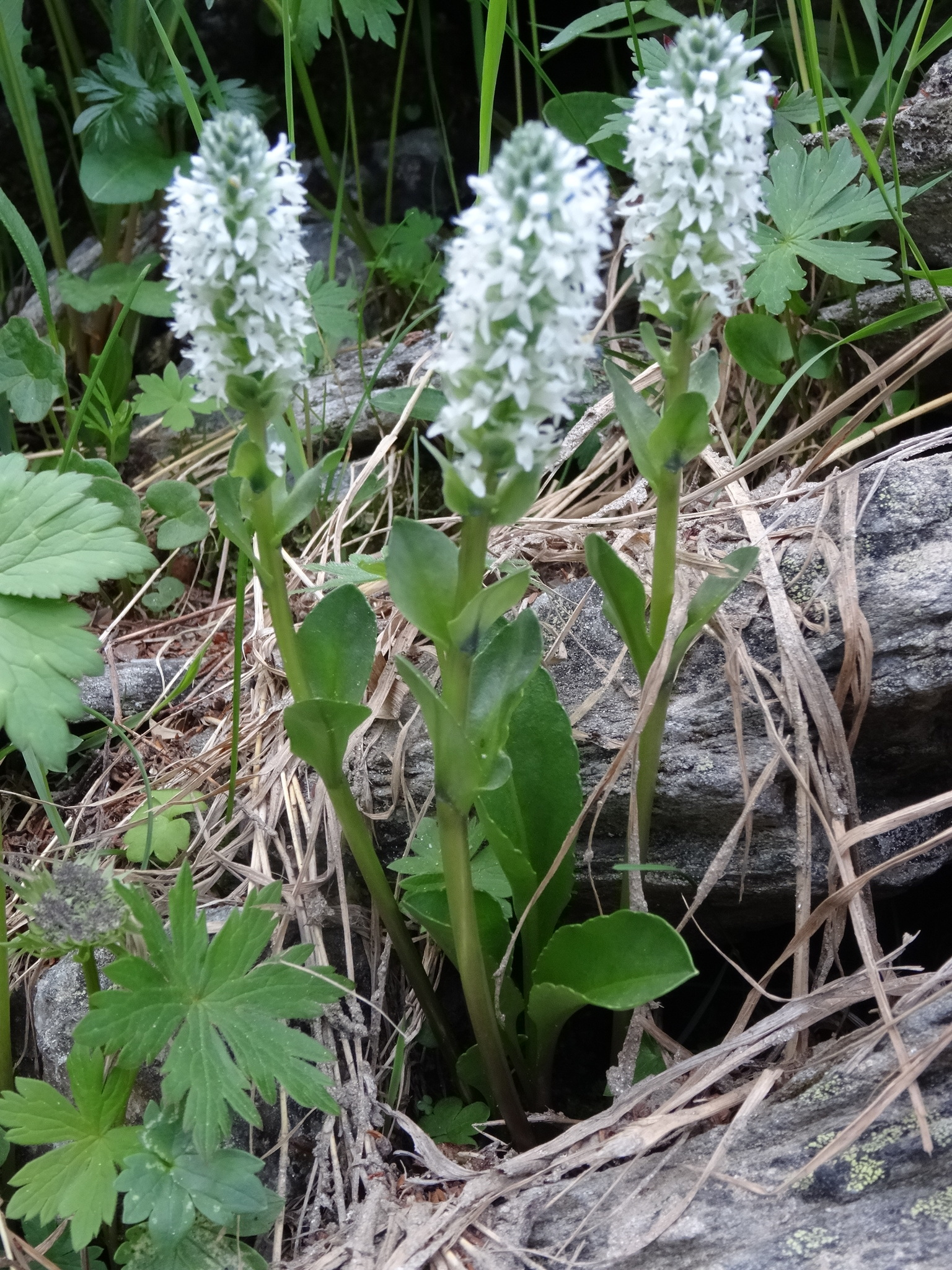
- Lagotis uralensis

Scientific classification
- Kingdom: Plantae
- Clade: Tracheophytes
- Clade: Angiosperms
- Clade: Eudicots
- Clade: Asterids
- Order: Lamiales
- Family: Plantaginaceae
- Tribe: Veroniceae
- Genus: Lagotis; Gaertn.

= Lagotis (plant) =

Genus of plants

Lagotis is a genus of flowering plants belonging to the family Plantaginaceae.

Its native range is Eastern Europe to Temperate Asia, Subarctic America.

Species:

- Lagotis alutacea W.W.Sm.
- Lagotis angustibracteata P.C.Tsoong & H.P.Yang
- Lagotis blatteri O.E.Schulz
- Lagotis brachystachya Maxim.
- Lagotis brevituba Maxim.
- Lagotis cashmeriana (Royle ex Benth.) Rupr.
- Lagotis chumbica R.R.Mill
- Lagotis clarkei Hook.f.
- Lagotis crassifolia Prain
- Lagotis decumbens Rupr.
- Lagotis glauca Gaertn.
- Lagotis globosa Hook.f.
- Lagotis humilis P.C.Tsoong & H.P.Yang
- Lagotis ikonnikovii Schischk.
- Lagotis integra W.W.Sm.
- Lagotis integrifolia (Willd.) Schischk.
- Lagotis kongboensis T.Yamaz.
- Lagotis korolkowii (Regel & Schmalh.) Maxim.
- Lagotis kunawurensis (Royle ex Benth.) Rupr.
- Lagotis macrosiphon P.C.Tsoong & H.P.Yang
- Lagotis nepalensis T.Yamaz.
- Lagotis pharica Prain
- Lagotis praecox W.W.Sm.
- Lagotis ramalana Batalin
- Lagotis stolonifera (K.Koch) Maxim.
- Lagotis takedana Miyabe & Tatew.
- Lagotis uralensis Schischk.
- Lagotis wardii W.W.Sm.
- Lagotis yesoensis (Miyabe & Tatew.) Tatew. ex Ohwi
- Lagotis yunnanensis W.W.Sm.
