= Ildefonsia =

Scientific classification
- Kingdom: Plantae
- Clade: Tracheophytes
- Clade: Angiosperms
- Clade: Eudicots
- Clade: Asterids
- Order: Lamiales
- Family: Plantaginaceae
- Genus: Ildefonsia; Gardner (1842)
- Species: I. bibracteata

Binomial name
- Ildefonsia bibracteata Gardner (1842)

Genus of plants

Ildefonsia is a monotypic genus of flowering plants belonging to the family Plantaginaceae. The only species is Ildefonsia bibracteata.

It is native to Rio de Janeiro state in southeastern Brazil.

The genus name of Ildefonsia is in honour of Antonio Ildefonso Gomes de Freitas (1794–1859), a Brazilian botanist and doctor in Rio de Janeiro. The Latin specific epithet of bibracteata refers to 'bi' meaning 2 and 'bracteate' meaning possessing bracts which is a modified leaf associated with a flower or inflorescence. Both genus and species were first described and published by George Gardner in 1842.
