= Fonkia =

Scientific classification
- Kingdom: Plantae
- Clade: Tracheophytes
- Clade: Angiosperms
- Clade: Eudicots
- Clade: Asterids
- Order: Lamiales
- Family: Plantaginaceae
- Genus: Fonkia; Phil. (1860)
- Species: F. uliginosa

Binomial name
- Fonkia uliginosa Phil. (1860)

Synonyms
- Braunblanquetia Eskuche; Braunblanquetia littoralis Eskuche (1974); Gratiola uliginosa (Phil.) F.Phil. (1881)

Genus of plants

Fonkia is a monotypic genus of flowering plants belonging to the family Plantaginaceae. The only species is Fonkia uliginosa.

It is native to central and southern Chile and south-western Argentina.

The genus is named after Francisco Fonk (1830–1912), a Chilean doctor. The epithet of uliginosa is from the Latin word, of marshes; from uligo meaning dampness. It was first described and published in Linnaea Vol.30 on page 198 in 1860.
