= Boelckea =

Conservation status
- Endangered (IUCN 3.1)

Scientific classification
- Kingdom: Plantae
- Clade: Tracheophytes
- Clade: Angiosperms
- Clade: Eudicots
- Clade: Asterids
- Order: Lamiales
- Family: Plantaginaceae
- Genus: Boelckea; Rossow (1992)
- Species: B. beckii

Binomial name
- Boelckea beckii Rossow (1992)

Genus of flowering plants

Boelckea beckii is a species of flowering plant belonging to the family Plantaginaceae. It is the sole species in genus Boelckea. It is an annual herb growing up to 30 cm tall. It is endemic to Bolivia, where it is known from three or four collections at Ixiamas and Luisita in Abel Iturralde Province and at Noel Kempff Mercado National Park in José Miguel de Velasco Province. It lives in humid savanna from 180 to 233 meters elevation. It is assessed as endangered, with a limited range and threatened with habitat loss from cattle grazing and introduced grasses.
