= Darcya =

Scientific classification
- Kingdom: Plantae
- Clade: Tracheophytes
- Clade: Angiosperms
- Clade: Eudicots
- Clade: Asterids
- Order: Lamiales
- Family: Plantaginaceae
- Genus: Darcya; B.L.Turner & C.P.Cowan

Genus of flowering plants

Darcya is a genus of flowering plants belonging to the family Plantaginaceae.

Its native range is Costa Rica to Colombia.

The genus name of Darcya is in honour of William Gerald D'Arcy (1931–1999), Canadian-born American botanist at the Missouri Botanical Garden, and was published in Phytologia Vol.74 on page 268 in 1993.

Species known according to Kew;

- Darcya costaricensis (B.L.Turner) B.L.Turner
- Darcya mutisii (Fern.Alonso) B.L.Turner
- Darcya reliquiarum (D'Arcy) B.L.Turner & C.P.Cowan
