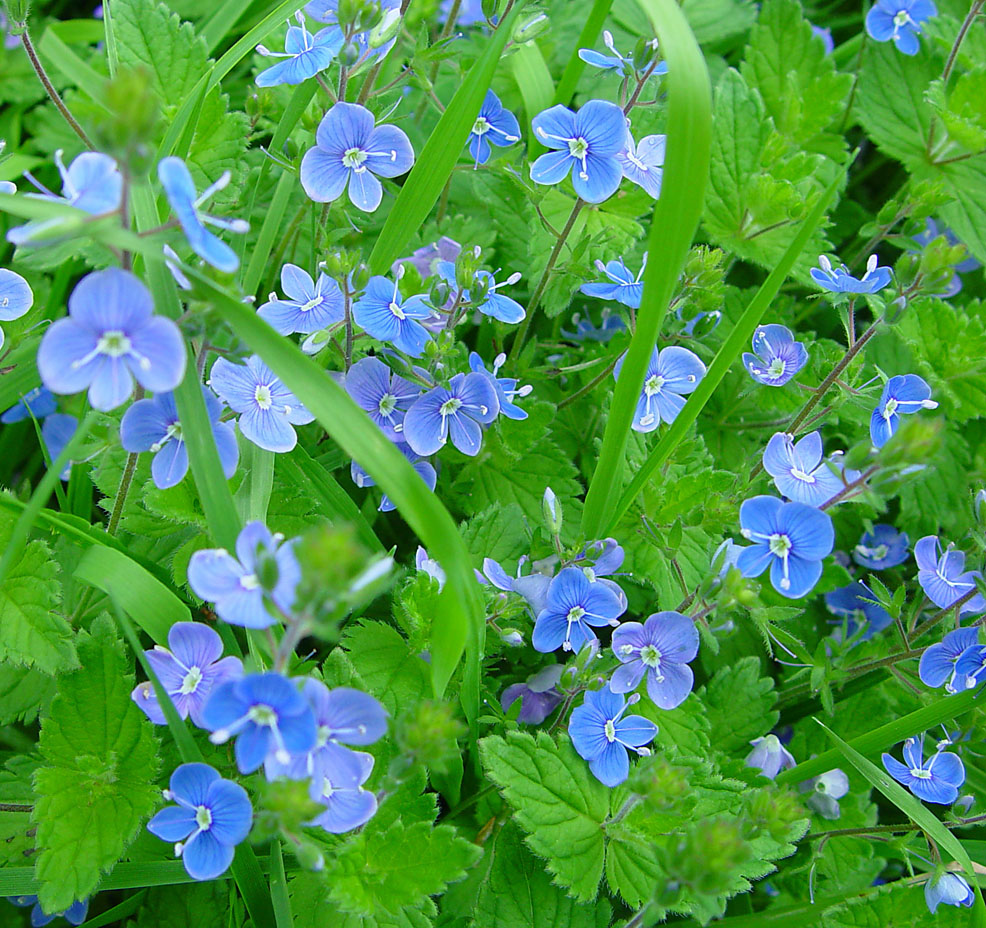
- Veronica chamaedrys

Scientific classification
- Kingdom: Plantae
- Clade: Embryophytes
- Clade: Tracheophytes
- Clade: Angiosperms
- Clade: Eudicots
- Clade: Asterids
- Order: Lamiales
- Family: Plantaginaceae
- Tribe: Veroniceae; Duby

= Veroniceae =

Tribe of plants

Veroniceae is a plant tribe in the family Plantaginaceae. It contains about 10 genera, including Veronica (speedwells) and Veronicastrum (Culver's roots).

== Taxonomy ==
Veroniceae contains the following genera:

- Kashmiria (1 species) ― Western Himalayas,
- Lagotis (30 species) ― Eastern Europe to Temperate Asia, Subarctic America,
- Neopicrorhiza (2 species) ― Himalayas to South-Central China,
- Paederota (2 species) ― Eastern Alps of Austria, Italy, and Slovenia,
- Picrorhiza (2 species) ― Pakistan to Western Himalayas,
- Scrofella (1 species) ― Western and Central China,
- Veronica (462 species) ― Worldwide,
- Veronicastrum (19 species) ― Eastern Asia and Eastern North America,
- Wulfenia (4 species) ― Albania, Austria, Italy, Lebanon-Syria, Turkey, Yugoslavia,
- Wulfeniopsis (2 species) ― Nepal, West Himalaya, Pakistan and Afghanistan.
