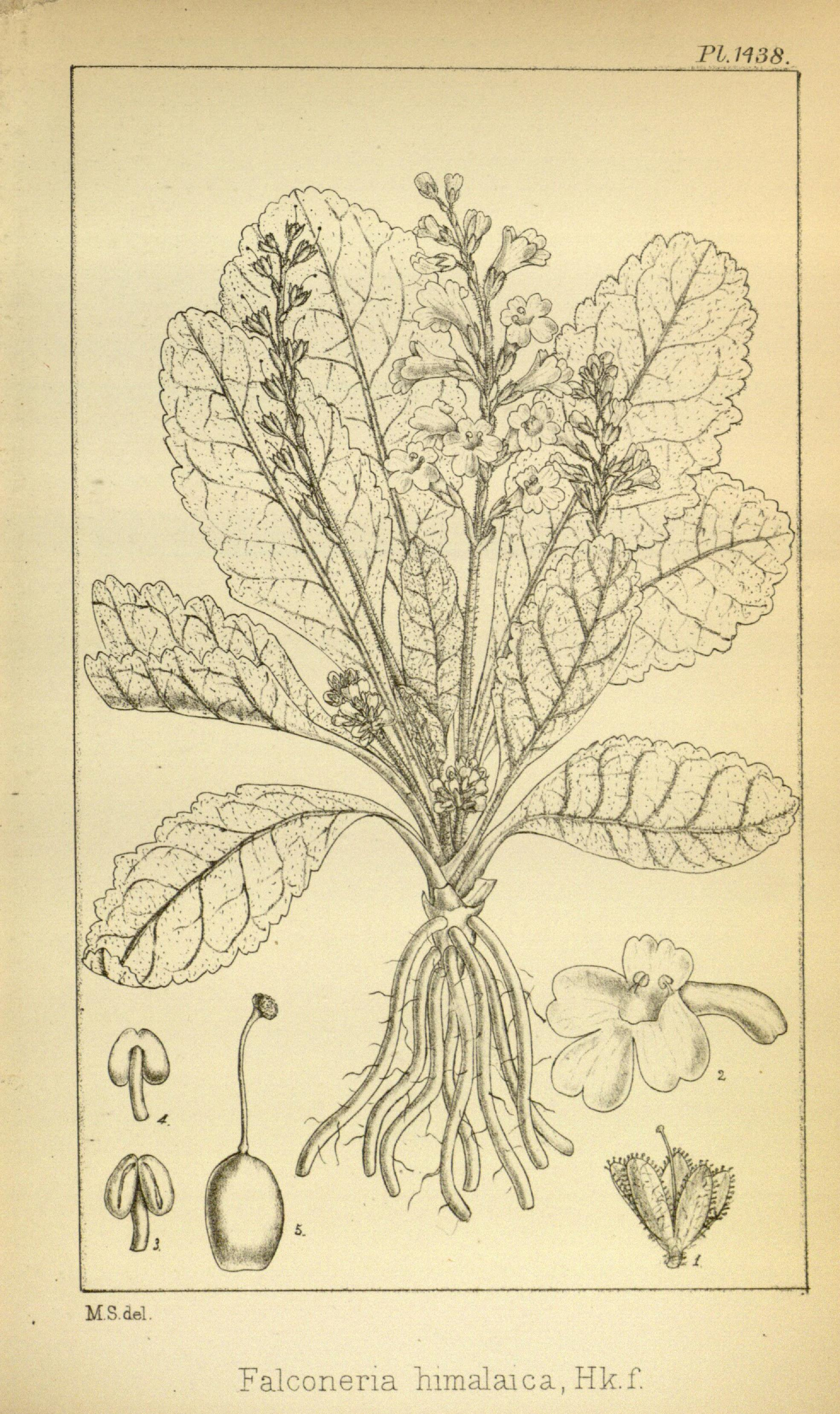
- Kashmiria himalaica

Scientific classification
- Kingdom: Plantae
- Clade: Tracheophytes
- Clade: Angiosperms
- Clade: Eudicots
- Clade: Asterids
- Order: Lamiales
- Family: Plantaginaceae
- Tribe: Veroniceae
- Genus: Kashmiria; D.Y.Hong (1980)
- Species: K. himalaica

Binomial name
- Kashmiria himalaica (Hook.f.) D.Y.Hong

Synonyms
- Falconeria Hook.f. (1883), nom. illeg.; Falconeria himalaica Hook.f. (1883); Wulfenia himalaica (Hook.f.) Pennell (1943)

= Kashmiria =

Genus of plants

Kashmiria himalaica is a species of flowering plant belonging to the family Plantaginaceae. It is the sole species in genus Kashmiria. It is native to the Western Himalaya.
