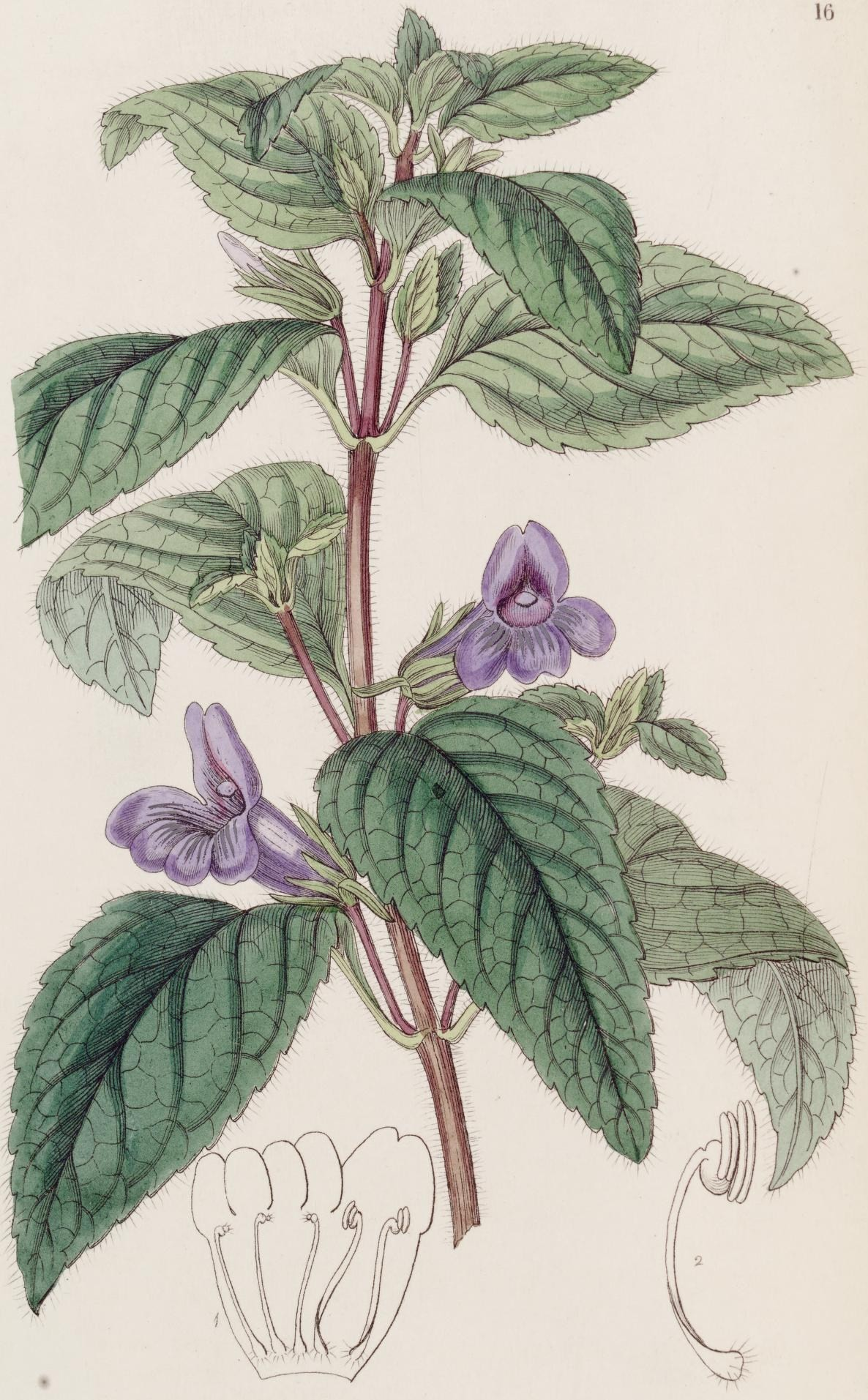
- Adenosma glutinosa

Scientific classification
- Kingdom: Plantae
- Clade: Tracheophytes
- Clade: Angiosperms
- Clade: Eudicots
- Clade: Asterids
- Order: Lamiales
- Family: Plantaginaceae
- Genus: Adenosma; R.Br.

= Adenosma =

Genus of flowering plants

Adenosma is a genus of flowering plants belonging to the family Plantaginaceae.

Its native range is Tropical and Subtropical Asia to Northern Australia.

Species:

- Adenosma annamensis T.Yamaz.
- Adenosma bracteosa Bonati
- Adenosma camphorata Hook.f.
- Adenosma cordifolia Bonati
- Adenosma debilis Bonati
- Adenosma elsholtzioides T.Yamaz.
- Adenosma glutinosa (L.) Druce
- Adenosma hirsuta (Miq.) Kurz
- Adenosma indiana (Lour.) Merr.
- Adenosma inopinata Prain
- Adenosma javanica (Blume) Koord.
- Adenosma macrophylla Benth.
- Adenosma malabarica Hook.f.
- Adenosma microcephala Hook.f.
- Adenosma muelleri Benth.
- Adenosma nelsonioides (Miq.) Hallier f. ex Bremek.
- Adenosma papuana Schltr.
- Adenosma punctata Pennell
- Adenosma retusiloba P.C.Tsoong & T.L.Chin
- Adenosma subrepens (Thwaites) Benth. ex Hook.f.
- Adenosma ternata Pennell
- Adenosma thorelii Bonati
