= Dizygostemon =

Scientific classification
- Kingdom: Plantae
- Clade: Tracheophytes
- Clade: Angiosperms
- Clade: Eudicots
- Clade: Asterids
- Order: Lamiales
- Family: Plantaginaceae
- Genus: Dizygostemon (Benth.) Radlk. ex Wettst.

Genus of plants

Dizygostemon is a genus of flowering plants belonging to the family Plantaginaceae.

Its native range is Northeastern Brazil.

Species:

- Dizygostemon angustifolius Giul.
- Dizygostemon floribundus (Benth.) Radlk.
- Dizygostemon riparius Scatigna & Colletta
