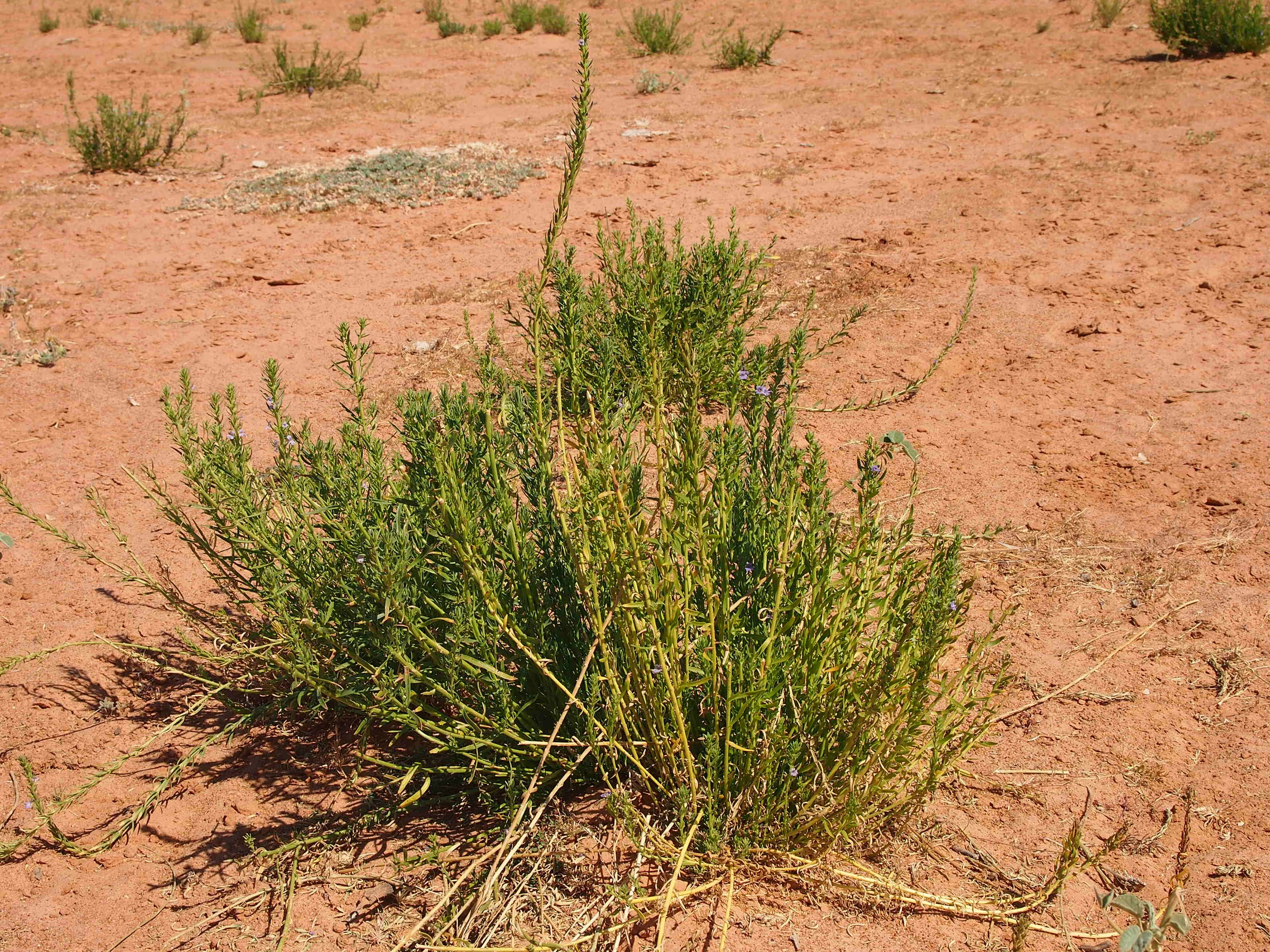
- Stemodia florulenta

Scientific classification
- Kingdom: Plantae
- Clade: Tracheophytes
- Clade: Angiosperms
- Clade: Eudicots
- Clade: Asterids
- Order: Lamiales
- Family: Plantaginaceae
- Tribe: Gratioleae
- Genus: Stemodia; L. (1759)

Species
- 45; see text

Synonyms
- Angervilla Neck. (1790), opus utique oppr.; Dickia Scop. (1777); Gomphipus Raf. (1838); Lendneria Minod (1918); Poarium Desv. (1825); Stemodiacra P.Browne (1756); Unanuea Ruiz & Pav. ex Pennell (1919 publ. 1920); Valeria Minod (1918); Verena Minod (1918)

= Stemodia =

Genus of flowering plants

Stemodia is a genus of flowering plants in the family Plantaginaceae. The genus comprises approximately 45 species of annual and perennial herbs and shrubs which are distributed through tropical and temperate regions of the Americas, sub-Saharan Africa, the Indian subcontinent, and Australia. This genus is sometimes placed in the families Scrophulariaceae or Gratiolaceae. The generic name is derived from the Latin word stemodiacra, which means "stamens with two tips." Twintip is a common name for several species.

== Species ==
45 species are accepted.

- Stemodia anisata A.R.Bean
- Stemodia bartsioides Benth.
- Stemodia chiapensis B.L.Turner
- Stemodia chodatii Minod
- Stemodia coahuilensis (Henrickson) B.L.Turner – Coahuila twintip
- Stemodia debilis Benth.
- Stemodia diplohyptoides M.M.Sosa & Dematt.
- Stemodia durantifolia (L.) Sw. – white woolly twintip
- Stemodia flaccida W.Fitzg.
- Stemodia florulenta W.R.Barker – bluerod
- Stemodia foliosa Benth.
- Stemodia fruticosa Lundell
- Stemodia fruticulosa Tzvelev
- Stemodia glabella W.R.Barker – bluerod
- Stemodia grossa Benth. – marsh stemodia
- Stemodia hassleriana Chodat
- Stemodia hyptoides Cham. & Schltdl.
- Stemodia jorullensis Kunth
- Stemodia kingii F.Muell.
- Stemodia lanata Ruiz & Pav. ex Benth. – gray woolly twintip
- Stemodia lanceolata Benth.
- Stemodia lathraia W.R.Barker
- Stemodia linophylla F.Muell.
- Stemodia lobelioides Lehm.
- Stemodia lythrifolia F.Muell. ex Benth. – bunu bunu
- Stemodia macrantha B.L.Rob.
- Stemodia maritima L. – seaside twintip
- Stemodia palmeri A.Gray
- Stemodia palustris A.St.-Hil.
- Stemodia peduncularis Benth.
- Stemodia perfoliata Scatigna & V.C.Souza
- Stemodia piurensis Pennell
- Stemodia pubescens (R.Br.) W.R.Barker
- Stemodia purpusii Brandegee
- Stemodia pusilla Benth.
- Stemodia schottii Holz. – Rio Grande twintip
- Stemodia scoparioides Hassl. & Minod
- Stemodia serrata (Hochst.) Benth.
- Stemodia stricta Cham. & Schltdl.
- Stemodia suffruticosa Kunth
- Stemodia tenuifolia Minod
- Stemodia tephropelina W.R.Barker
- Stemodia trifoliata (Link) Rchb.
- Stemodia verticillata (Mill.) Hassl. – whorled twintip
- Stemodia viscosa Roxb. – pagurda

=== Formerly placed here ===
- Anamaria heterophylla (Giul. & V.C.Souza) V.C.Souza (as Stemodia heterophylla Giul. & V.C.Souza)
- Chodaphyton ericifolium (Kuntze) Minod (as Stemodia ericifolia (Kuntze) K.Schum.)
- Umbraria microphylla (J.A.Schmidt) Scatigna (as Stemodia microphylla J.A.Schmidt)
- Umbraria veronicoides (J.A.Schmidt) Scatigna (as Stemodia veronicoides J.A.Schmidt)

== Gallery ==
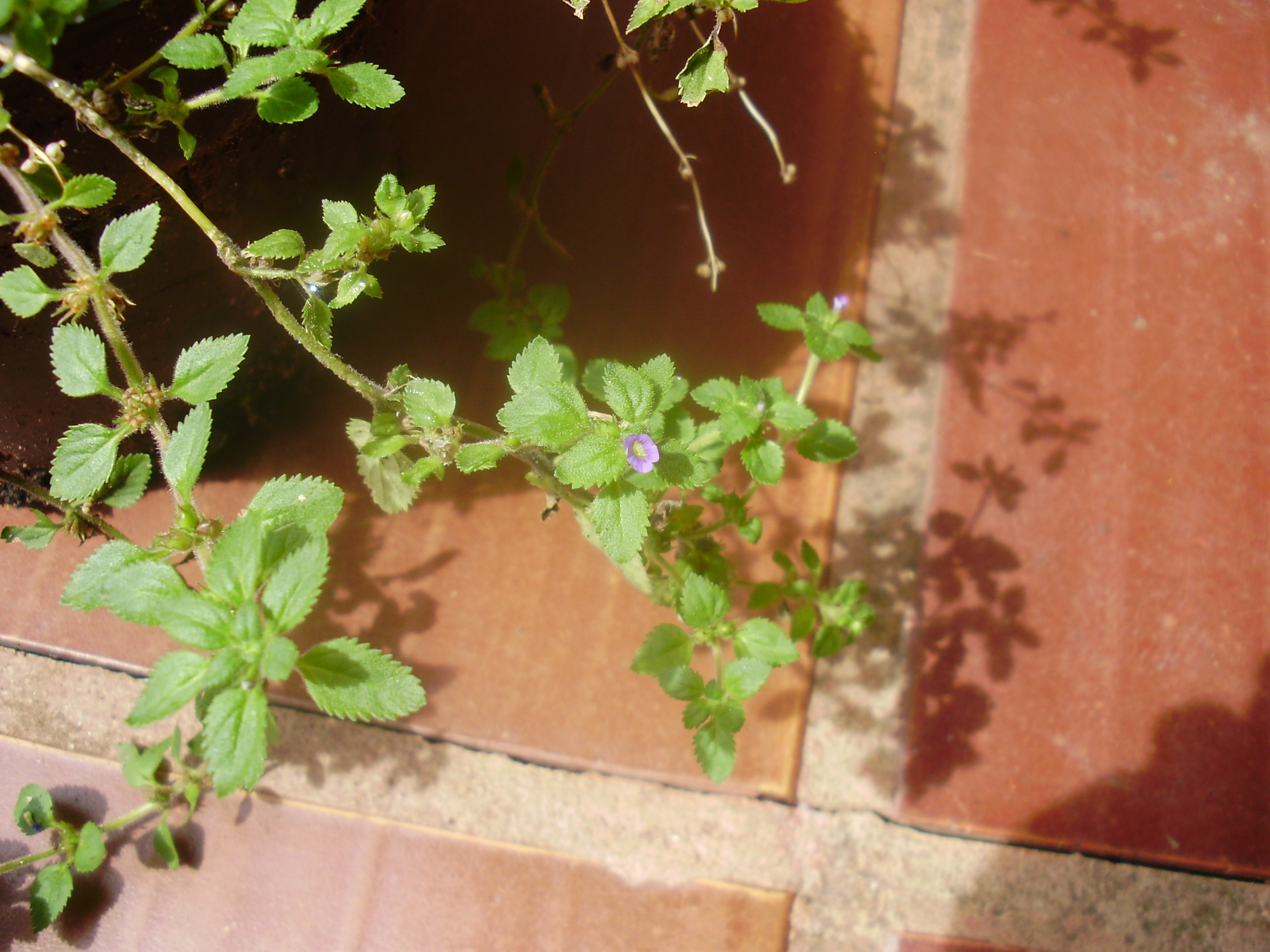
Stemodia verticillata
