= Chodaphyton =

Scientific classification
- Kingdom: Plantae
- Clade: Tracheophytes
- Clade: Angiosperms
- Clade: Eudicots
- Clade: Asterids
- Order: Lamiales
- Family: Plantaginaceae
- Genus: Chodaphyton; Minod (1918)
- Species: C. ericifolium

Binomial name
- Chodaphyton ericifolium (Kuntze) Minod (1918)

Synonyms
- Stemodia ericifolia (Kuntze) K.Schum. (1898); Stemodia ericifolia subsp. vera Hassl. (1910); Stemodiacra ericifolia Kuntze (1898)

Genus of flowering plants

Chodaphyton ericifolium is a species of flowering plant in the family Plantaginaceae. It is the sole species in genus Chodaphyton. It is a perennial native to South America, ranging from west-central Brazil to Paraguay and northern Argentina.
