= Anamaria heterophylla =

Scientific classification
- Kingdom: Plantae
- Clade: Tracheophytes
- Clade: Angiosperms
- Clade: Eudicots
- Clade: Asterids
- Order: Lamiales
- Family: Plantaginaceae
- Genus: Anamaria; V.C.Souza (2001)
- Species: A. heterophylla

Binomial name
- Anamaria heterophylla (Giul. & V.C.Souza) V.C.Souza (2001)

Synonyms
- Stemodia heterophylla Giul. & V.C.Souza (1990 publ. 1991)

Species of flowering plant

Anamaria heterophylla is a species of flowering plant in the family Plantaginaceae. It is the sole species in genus Anamaria. It is endemic to northeastern Brazil.

The species was first described in 1991 as Stemodia heterophylla. In 2001 it was placed in its own genus as Anamaria heterophylla.
