= Hemiphragma heterophyllum =

Scientific classification
- Kingdom: Plantae
- Clade: Tracheophytes
- Clade: Angiosperms
- Clade: Eudicots
- Clade: Asterids
- Order: Lamiales
- Family: Plantaginaceae
- Genus: Hemiphragma; Wall. (1822)
- Species: H. heterophyllum

Binomial name
- Hemiphragma heterophyllum Wall. (1822)

Varieties
- Hemiphragma heterophyllum var. dentatum (Elmer) T.Yamaz.; Hemiphragma heterophyllum var. heterophyllum; Hemiphragma heterophyllum var. pedicellatum Hand.-Mazz.

Species of flowering plant

Hemiphragma heterophyllum is a genus of flowering plants belonging to the family Plantaginaceae. It is a perennial native to the central and eastern Himalaya, Myanmar, central and southern China, Taiwan, the Philippines, and Sulawesi.

Three varieties are accepted.

- Hemiphragma heterophyllum var. dentatum (Elmer) T.Yamaz. – southeastern China (Guangxi), Taiwan, and the Philippines
- Hemiphragma heterophyllum var. heterophyllum – Himalayas to Myanmar, central and southern China, Taiwan, Philippines, and Sulawesi
- Hemiphragma heterophyllum var. pedicellatum (Hand.-Mazz. – northwestern Yunnan in south-central China
