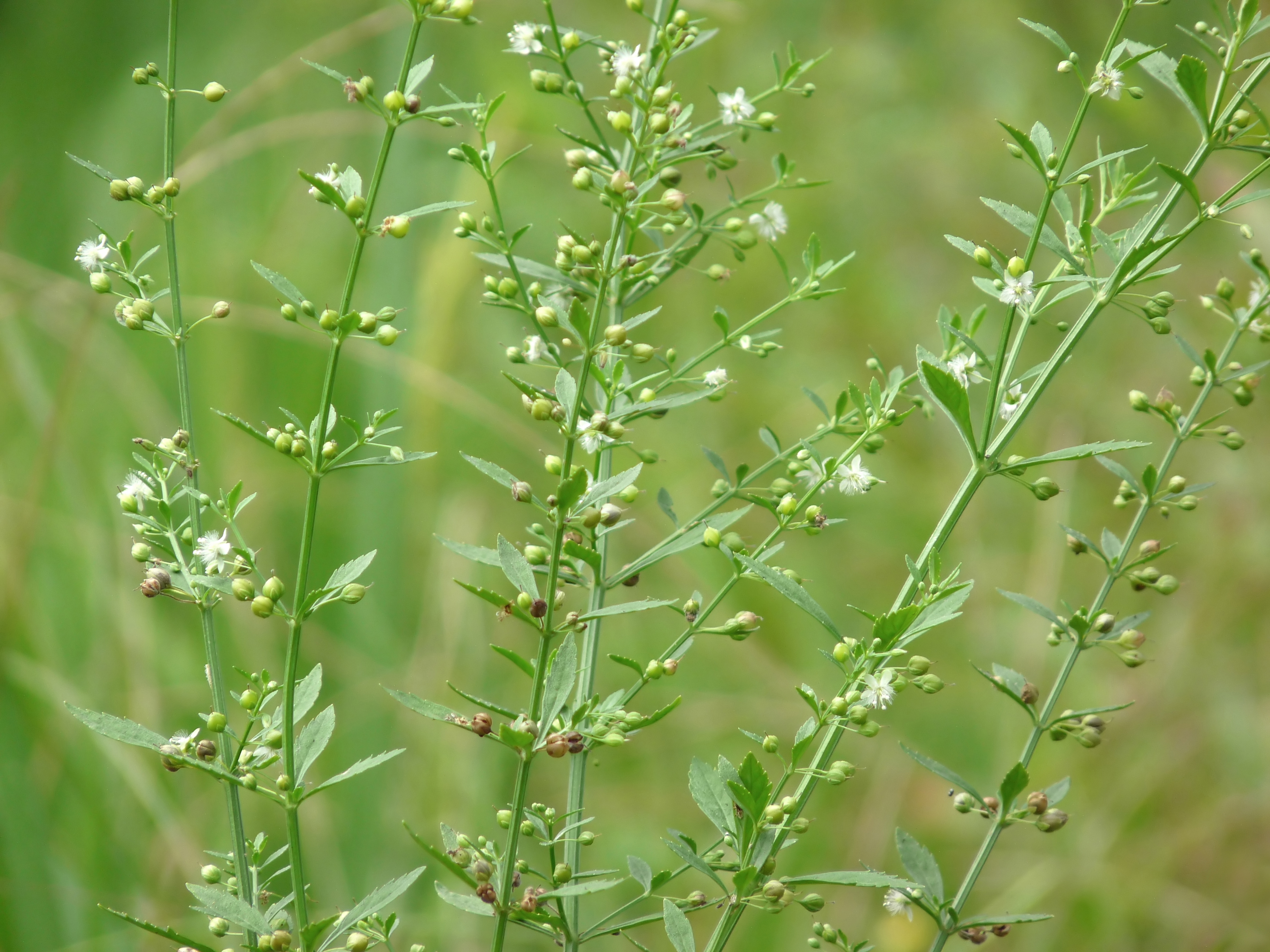
- Scoparia dulcis

Scientific classification
- Kingdom: Plantae
- Clade: Embryophytes
- Clade: Tracheophytes
- Clade: Angiosperms
- Clade: Eudicots
- Clade: Asterids
- Order: Lamiales
- Family: Plantaginaceae; Juss.

Type genus
- Plantago L.

Tribes
- Angelonieae; Antirrhineae; Callitricheae; Cheloneae; Digitalideae; Globularieae; Gratioleae; Hemiphragmeae; Plantagineae; Russelieae; Sibthorpieae; Veroniceae

Synonyms
- Antirrhinaceae Pers.; Aragoaceae D.Don; Callitrichaceae Link nom. cons.; Chelonaceae Martinov; Digitalaceae Martinov; Ellisiophyllaceae Honda; Globulariaceae DC. nom. cons.; Gratiolaceae Martinov; Hippuridaceae Vest nom. cons.; Littorellaceae Gray; Psylliaceae Horan.; Sibthorpiaceae D.Don; Veronicaceae Cassel

= Plantaginaceae =

Family of flowering plants

Plantaginaceae, the plantain family or veronica family, is a large, diverse family of flowering plants in the order Lamiales that includes common flowers such as snapdragon and foxglove. It is unrelated to the banana-like fruit also called "plantain". In older classifications, Plantaginaceae was the only family of the order Plantaginales, but numerous phylogenetic studies, summarized by the Angiosperm Phylogeny Group, have demonstrated that this taxon should be included within Lamiales.

== Overview ==
The plantain family as traditionally circumscribed consisted of only three genera: Bougueria, Littorella, and Plantago. However phylogenetic research has indicated that Plantaginaceae sensu stricto (in the strict sense) were nested within Scrophulariaceae (but forming a group that did not include the type genus of that family, Scrophularia). Although Veronicaceae (1782) is the oldest family name for this group, Plantaginaceae (1789) is a conserved name under the International Code of Botanical Nomenclature (ICBN) and thus has priority over any earlier family name for a family including Plantago. Furthermore, the ICBN does not consider family names published before 1789 to be names eligible for conservation, thus ruling out Veronicaceae. The name Antirrhinaceae has been proposed for conservation over Plantaginaceae. In the meantime, the Angiosperm Phylogeny Group has accepted the name Plantaginaceae. However, Olmstead (2003) chose to use the name Veronicaceae, a later synonym. The Plantaginaceae is additionally called the veronica family in English.

A group of genera including Lindernia has now been segregated as the family Linderniaceae, which is recognized by Haston et al. 2007 (also known as LAPG II) as "Post-APG II family."

Plantaginaceae sensu lato (in the broad sense) are a diverse, cosmopolitan family, occurring mostly in temperate zones. The group consists of herbs, shrubs and also a few aquatic plants with roots (such as the genus Callitriche). As the family is so diverse, its circumscription is difficult to establish.

The leaves are spiral to opposite and simple to compound. Unusual in Lamiales is the absence of vertical partitions in the heads of the glandular hairs.

The structure and form of the flowers is variable. Some genera are 4-merous (i.e., with 4 sepals and 4 petals), such as Aragoa (but this one has 5 sepals); others are 5- to 8-merous, such as Sibthorpia. The flowers of most genera are polysymmetric. The corolla is often two-lipped. In some taxa, the androecium is formed before the corolla.

The fruit is a loculicidal capsule, dehiscing through the partitions between the cells.

== Genera ==
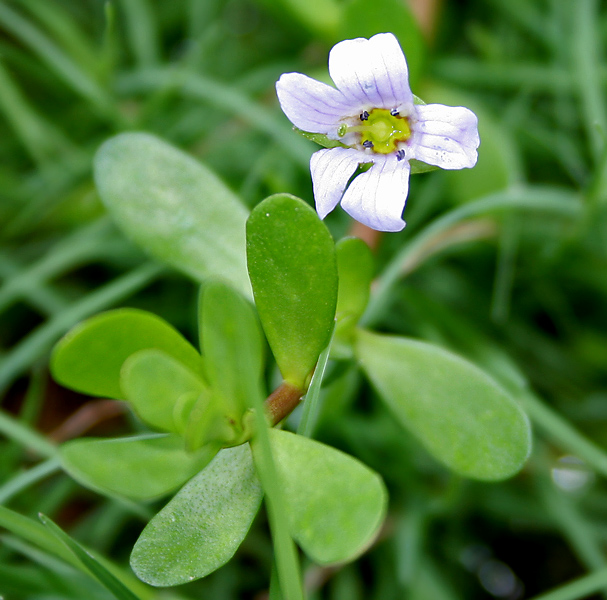
Bacopa monnieri in Hyderabad, India

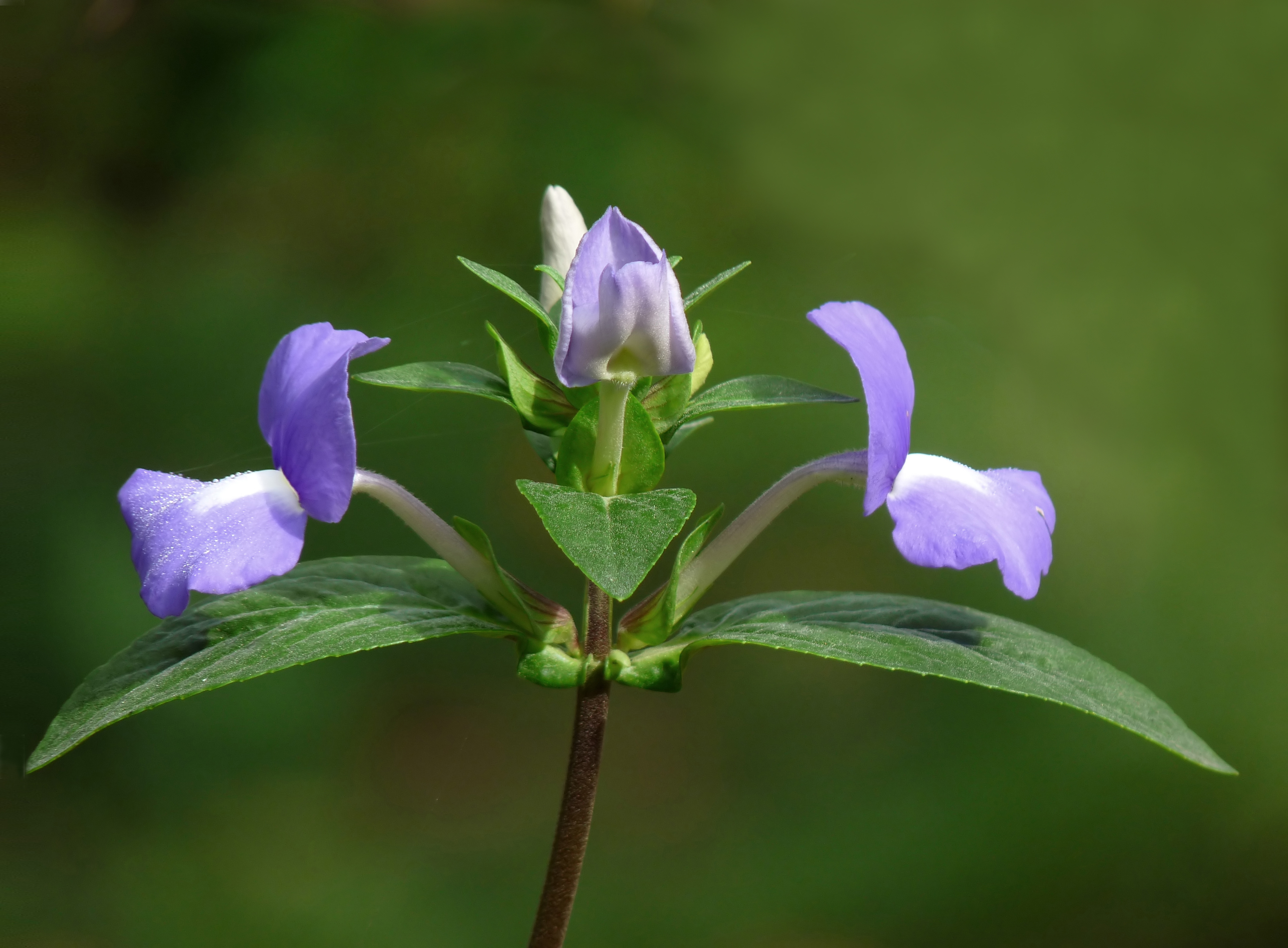
Matourea azurea in Kerala

The enlarged Plantaginaceae consists of 107 genera and about 1,900 species. The largest genus is Veronica, with about 450 species. Veronica also includes the genera Hebe, Parahebe and Synthyris, formerly often treated as distinct. All genera of Plantaginaceae were formerly included in Scrophulariaceae except where otherwise stated.

Tribe Angelonieae

- Angelonia Humb. & Bonpl.
- Basistemon Turcz.
- Melosperma Benth.
- Monttea Gay
- Ourisia Comm. ex Juss.

Tribe Antirrhineae

- Acanthorrhinum Rothm.
- Albraunia Speta
- Anarrhinum Desf.
- Antirrhinum L.
- Asarina Mill.
- Chaenorhinum (DC.) Rchb.
- Cymbalaria Hill
- Epixiphium (Engelm. ex A.Gray) Munz
- Gadoria Güemes & Mota
- Galvezia Dombey ex Juss.
- Gambelia Nutt.
- Holmgrenanthe Elisens
- Holzneria Speta
- Howelliella Rothm.
- Kickxia Dumort.
- Linaria Mill.
- Lophospermum D.Don
- Mabrya Elisens
- Maurandella (A.Gray) Rothm.
- Maurandya Ortega
- Misopates Raf.
- Mohavea A.Gray
- Nanorrhinum Betsche
- Neogaerrhinum Rothm.
- Nuttallanthus D.A.Sutton
- Pseudomisopates Güemes
- Pseudorontium (A.Gray) Rothm.
- Rhodochiton Zucc. ex Otto & A. Dietr.
- Sairocarpus D.A.Sutton
- Schweinfurthia A.Braun

Tribe Callitricheae

- Callitriche L.
- Hippuris L.

Tribe Cheloneae

- Brookea Benth.
- Chelone L.
- Chionophila Benth.
- Collinsia Nutt.
- Keckiella Straw
- Nothochelone (A.Gray) Straw
- Pennellianthus Crosswh.
- Penstemon Schmidel
- Tonella Nutt. ex A.Gray
- Uroskinnera Lindl.

Tribe Digitalideae

- Digitalis L.
- Erinus L.

Tribe Globularieae

- Campylanthus Roth
- Globularia L.
- Poskea Vatke

Tribe Gratioleae

- Adenosma R.Br.
- Bacopa Aubl.
- Benjaminia Mart. ex Benj.
- Boelckea Rossow
- Cheilophyllum Pennell ex Britton
- Chodaphyton Minod
- Darcya B.L.Turner & C.C.Cowan
- Deinostema T.Yamaz.
- Dizygostemon (Benth.) Radlk. ex Wettst.
- Dopatrium Buch.-Ham. ex Benth.
- Fonkia Phil.
- Geochorda Cham. & Schltdl.
- Gratiola L.
- Hydrotriche Zucc.
- Ildefonsia Gardner
- Lapaea Scatigna & V.C.Souza
- Leucospora Nutt.
- Limnophila R.Br.
- Matourea Aubl.
- Mecardonia Ruiz & Pav.
- Philcoxia P.Taylor & V.C.Souza
- Schistophragma Benth. ex Endl.
- Scoparia L.
- Stemodia L.
- Tetraulacium Turcz.
- Umbraria Scatigna & V.C.Souza

Tribe Hemiphragmeae

- Hemiphragma Wall.

Tribe Plantagineae

- Aragoa Kunth
- Littorella P.J.Bergius
- Plantago L.

Tribe Russelieae

- Russelia Jacq.
- Tetranema Benth.

Tribe Sibthorpieae

- Ellisiophyllum Maxim.
- Sibthorpia L.

Tribe Veroniceae

- Kashmiria D.Y.Hong
- Lagotis Gaertn.
- Neopicrorhiza D.Y.Hong
- Paederota L.
- Picrorhiza Royle ex Benth.
- Scrofella Maxim.
- Veronica L.
- Veronicastrum Heist. ex Fabr.
- Wulfenia Jacq.
- Wulfeniopsis D.Y.Hong

Tribe unknown

- Agathelpis Choisy
- Anamaria V.C.Souza
- Ancistrostylis T.Yamaz.
- Bythophyton Hook.f.
- Dintera Stapf
- Encopella Pennell
- Lafuentea Lag.
- Trapella Oliv.
- Triaenophora Soler.
- Trungboa Rauschert

Although GRIN includes Lafuentea Lag. in the tribe Antirrhineae, in the phylogenetic analysis of Fernández-Mazuecos et al. (2013) it was a sister to the Antirrhineae, as also noted by Albach (2005). For the time being it should be considered an outgroup.

=== Excluded genera ===
- Artanema D.Don → Linderniaceae
- Chamaegigas Dinter ex Heil → Linderniaceae
- Craterostigma Hochst. → Linderniaceae
- Limosella L. → Scrophulariaceae
- Lindenbergia Lehm. → Orobanchaceae
- Lindernia All. → Linderniaceae
- Micranthemum Michx. → Linderniaceae
- Microcarpaea R.Br. → Phrymaceae
- Picria Lour. → Linderniaceae
- Rehmannia Libosch. ex Fisch. & C.A.Mey. → Orobanchaceae
- Torenia L. → Linderniaceae

== Bibliography ==
- Vargas P, JA Rosselló, R Oyama, J Güemes. 2004 Molecular evidence for naturalness of genera in the tribe Antirrhineae (Scrophulariaceae) and three independent evolutionary lineages from the New World and the Old. Plant Syst Evol 249:151–172.
