= Linaria schirvanica =

Scientific classification
- Kingdom: Plantae
- Clade: Tracheophytes
- Clade: Angiosperms
- Clade: Eudicots
- Clade: Asterids
- Order: Lamiales
- Family: Plantaginaceae
- Genus: Linaria
- Species: L. schirvanica

Binomial name
- Linaria schirvanica Fomin

Synonyms
- Linaria violacea C.A. Meyer ex Kuprian.

Species of flowering plant

Linaria schirvanica is a species of flowering plant in the family Plantaginaceae found in the Transcaucasus region that was first described by Aleksandr Vasilyevich Fomin. Linaria schirvanica is included in the genus Linaria and the family Plantaginaceae. Species in the Linaria genus are known in English as toadflax.
