= Linaria almadensis =

Scientific classification
- Kingdom: Plantae
- Clade: Tracheophytes
- Clade: Angiosperms
- Clade: Eudicots
- Clade: Asterids
- Order: Lamiales
- Family: Plantaginaceae
- Genus: Linaria
- Species: L. almadensis

Binomial name
- Linaria almadensis Farminhão 2026

Species of flowering plant

Linaria almadensis is a species of toadflax in the plantain family Plantaginaceae, endemic to Portugal, specifically the coastal cliffs of Almada, (from where the species name comes) south of Lisbon. First described in 2026 by João Farminhão, it inhabits a very restricted area spanning only the sandy walls close to carbonate rocks in the cliffs pointed to the Tagus river with samples collected from rocks close to the Cristo Rei monument.

== Description ==
Its identifying features include green leaves with an obtuse-apiculate apex, densely gladular-pubescent inflorence axis, and orange corolla palate with a wider corolla tube in its lateral section. It blooms in April-May with frutification happening in May, and it has been found in altitudes between 20 and 89 m (66 and 292 ft) above sea level. It is a perennial herb, with branched roots and heteromorphic green stems between 26 and 48 cm (10 and 19 in) long. Its leaves come in whorls of 3-4 becoming alternate towards the inflorescence. Its corolla has 7 upper petals and tube is yellowish-white, palate orangey-yellow, spur yellowish-white or violet, with conspicuous dark veins.

== Distribution and habitat ==
Only 34 individuals were recorded living on site within an EOO of 16 km^{2} (6.2 sq mi), although more could be found on more difficult terrain between Cacilhas and Trafaria. It has been preliminarily attributed the status of Critically Endangered due to its restricted distribution, small confirmed numbers and threats to its natural habitat such as invasive species like Arundo donax L., Paraserianthes lophantha and Tropaeolum majus L..

== History ==
Linaria almadensis had been previously confused with other species from the Linaria genus such as Linaria polygalifolia, Linaria supina, Linaria tristis, and Linaria marginata. It was first collected in 1843 by the Austro-Hungarian botanist Friedrich Martin Josef Welwitsch (1806–1872), and in 1881 by the Portuguese gardener and botanical explorer António Ricardo da Cunha (1830–1893).
