= Linaria sagrensis =

Scientific classification
- Kingdom: Plantae
- Clade: Tracheophytes
- Clade: Angiosperms
- Clade: Eudicots
- Clade: Asterids
- Order: Lamiales
- Family: Plantaginaceae
- Genus: Linaria
- Species: L. sagrensis

Binomial name
- Linaria sagrensis Blanca, Cueto, J.Fuentes, L.Gut. & F.B.Navarro

Species of flowering plant

Linaria sagrensis is a species of perennial flowering plant in the family Plantaginaceae. It is endemic to the Sierra de la Sagra in the northern Granada province of southeastern Spain. First described in 2023 by Blanca et al., the species is found exclusively in high-mountain calcareous screes.

== Description ==
=== Morphology ===
A perennial herb characterized by being entirely glandular-hairy. It possesses an intricately branched root system suited for its mountain habitat.

=== Flowers ===
The plant features a dense, corymbiform inflorescence. The corolla is relatively small and pinkish-violet with distinct dark veins and a yellow to orange palate. Its spur is notably shorter than the rest of the corolla.

=== Fruit and seeds ===
The capsule is globose and glandular-hairy at its apex. Its seeds are large and black to dark greyish, featuring a light-grey wing and a mostly smooth disc with a few small tubercles.

== Taxonomy ==
=== Classification ===
It belongs to Linaria section Supinae.

=== Related species ===
It is morphologically similar to L. pruinosa, L. nevadensis, L. glacialis, and L. alpina subsp. alpina.

=== Discovery ===
The species was formally established in a study published in the Nordic Journal of Botany which also elevated L. aeruginea subsp. pruinosa to the species rank of L. pruinosa.

== Distribution and habitat ==
The species is a narrow endemic, restricted to the Mediterranean high mountains of the Betic Massif. It specifically thrives in the loose limestone rock of the Sierra de la Sagra.
