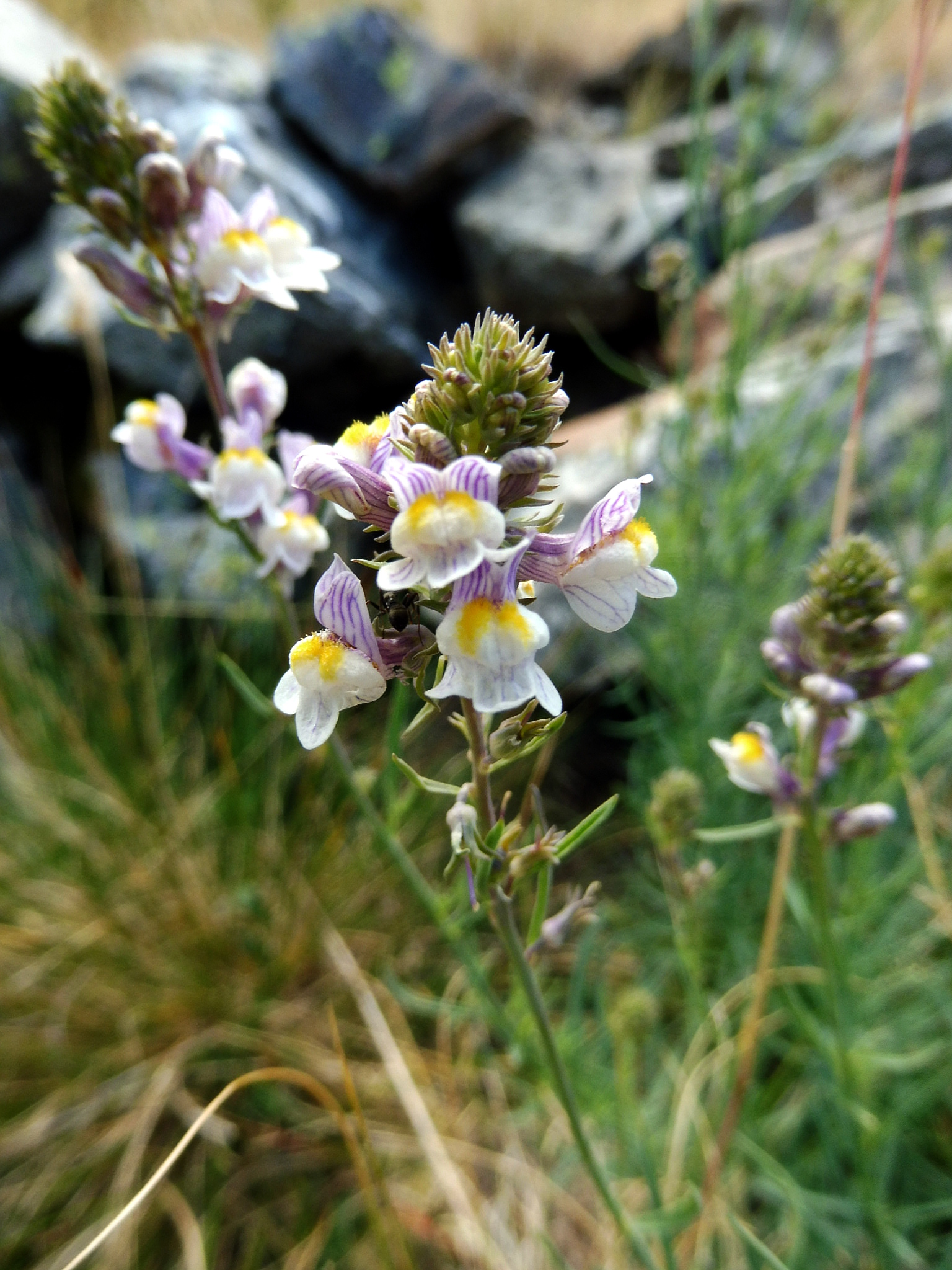

Scientific classification
- Kingdom: Plantae
- Clade: Tracheophytes
- Clade: Angiosperms
- Clade: Eudicots
- Clade: Asterids
- Order: Lamiales
- Family: Plantaginaceae
- Genus: Linaria
- Species: L. repens

Binomial name
- Linaria repens L. Mill.

Synonyms
- Linaria estriada

= Linaria repens =

Species of flowering plant

Linaria repens, also known as pale toadflax or creeping toadflax in Europe and as striped toadflax in the US, is an herbaceous plant in the family Plantaginaceae, native to Europe.

== Description ==
Linaria repens is a short-statured herb (maximum 80 cm), spreading by rhizomes. Upper flower petals are pale with purple veins. Lower petals are pale purple-white, usually with a yellow centre. Its appearance is similar to Linaria purpurea, and the flowers closely resemble Cymbalaria muralis so care must be taken in identification. It may also be poisonous.

== Habitat and distribution ==
This species is found in stony wasteground, along walls, in arable situations and on railways. It grows to a maximum altitude of just over 2,300 metres.

It is found across western Europe and has been introduced to the east coast of the United States.

In the United Kingdom, L. repens is theorised to be an archaeophyte, i.e. introduced before 1492. It is rarely found in the east of England or in Ireland.

== Etymology ==
The genus Linaria is named for the similarity of the plants' foliage to Linum (flax). The species epithet repens is Latin for 'creeping', referring to the growth habit of the plants. The 'pale' in the English common name refers to the colour of the flowers, in comparison with related species, and 'toadflax' is thought to refer to the plants' historical use to treat bubonic plague, a false link having been drawn at some point between the words 'bubo' and Bufo, which is Latin for toad.
