= Linaria chalepensis =

Scientific classification
- Kingdom: Plantae
- Clade: Tracheophytes
- Clade: Angiosperms
- Clade: Eudicots
- Clade: Asterids
- Order: Lamiales
- Family: Plantaginaceae
- Genus: Linaria
- Species: L. chalepensis

Binomial name
- Linaria chalepensis (L.) Mill.

Synonyms
- Antirrhinum chalepensis

Species of plant

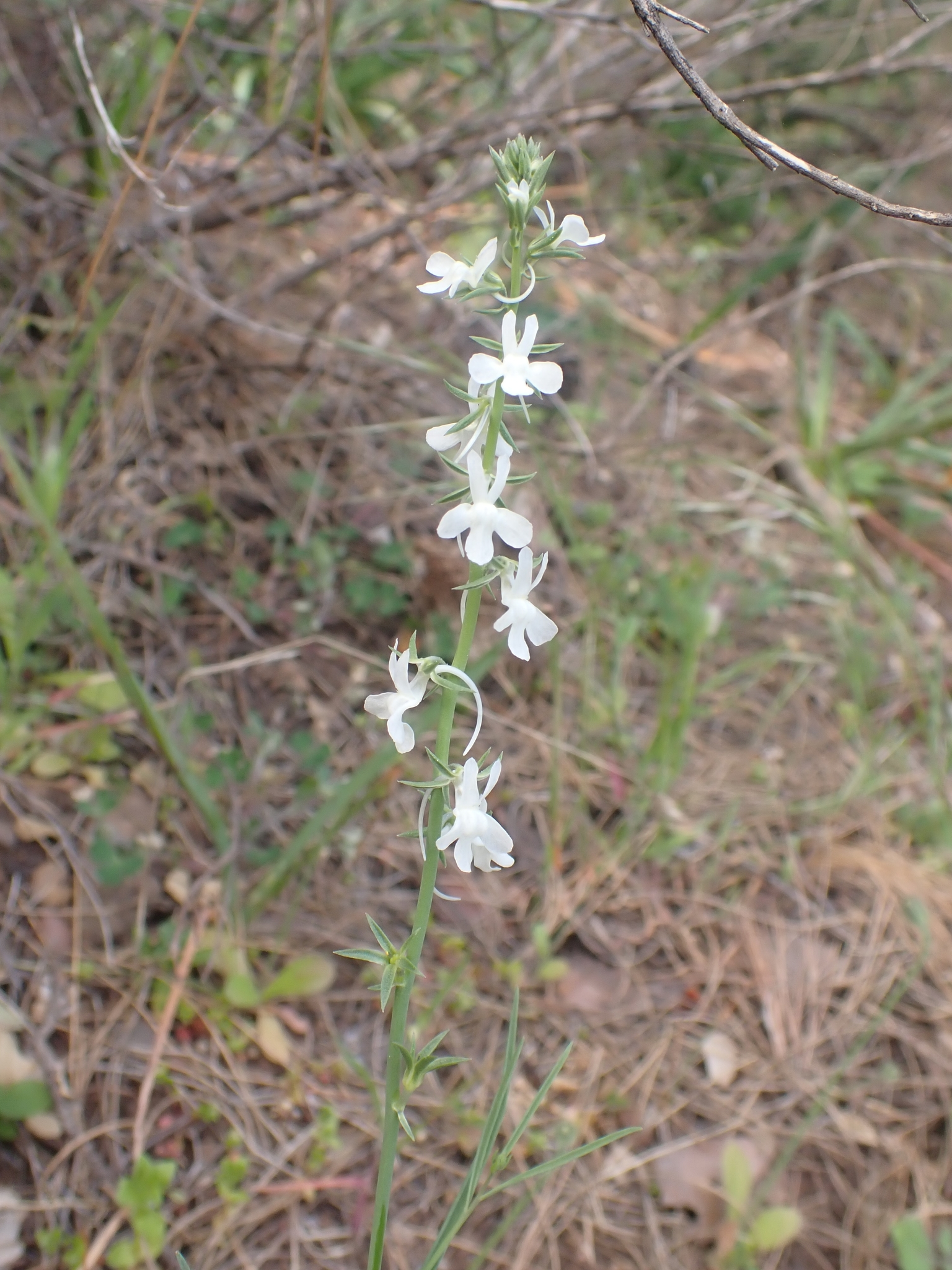
White Toadflax (Linaria chalepensis)

Linaria chalepensis is a white-flowered plant found in southern Europe, belonging to the family Plantaginaceae (plantain family; unrelated to the fruit).

== Sources ==
This article incorporates text from a free content work. Licensed under CC0 (license statement/permission). Text taken from Linaria chalepensis. Encyclopedia of Life.
