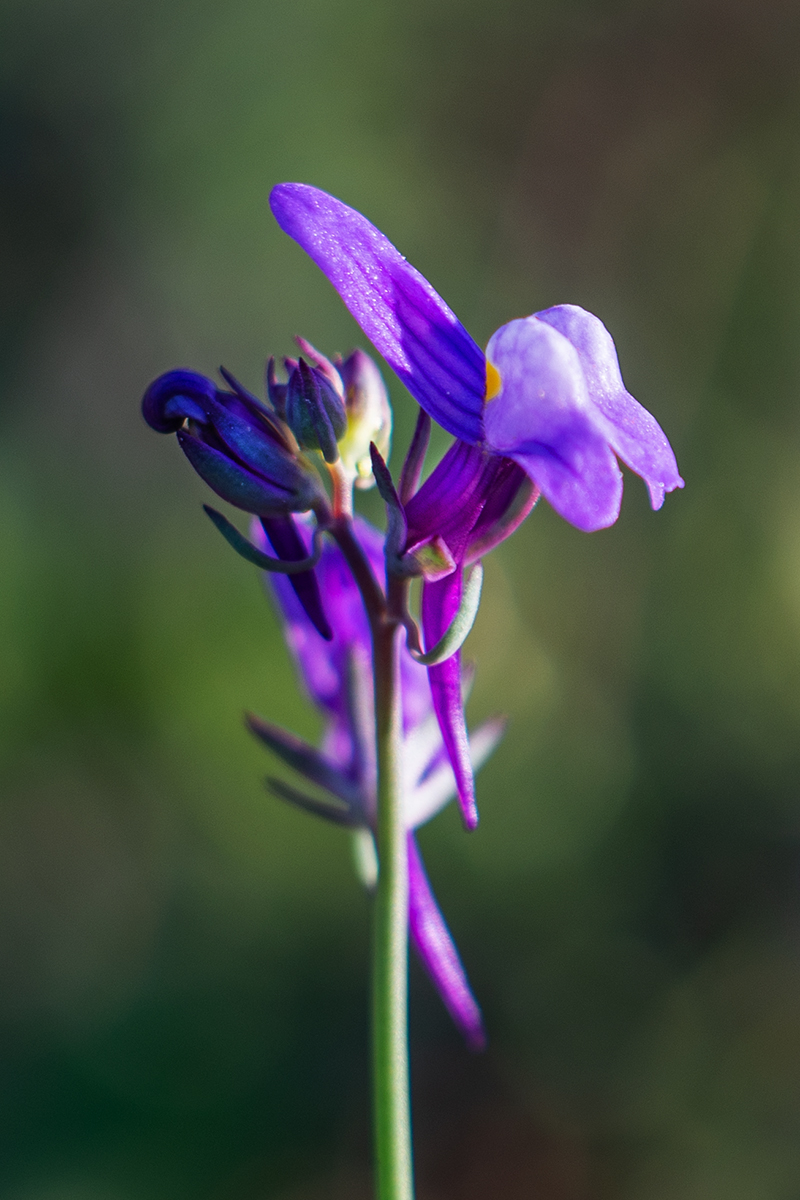

Conservation status
- Endangered (IUCN 3.1)

Scientific classification
- Kingdom: Plantae
- Clade: Tracheophytes
- Clade: Angiosperms
- Clade: Eudicots
- Clade: Asterids
- Order: Lamiales
- Family: Plantaginaceae
- Genus: Linaria
- Species: L. ricardoi

Binomial name
- Linaria ricardoi Cout.

= Linaria ricardoi =

Species of flowering plant

Linaria ricardoi is a rare species of flowering plant in the family Plantaginaceae endemic to Portugal. Its scientific authority is Coutinho (Cout.). Locally known as "Linária dos Olivais" it blossoms from February to June.

== Description ==
An annual plant with linear and thick leaf with a slightly curled tip. The flowers (15-20) have a small violet corolla (9-12mm).

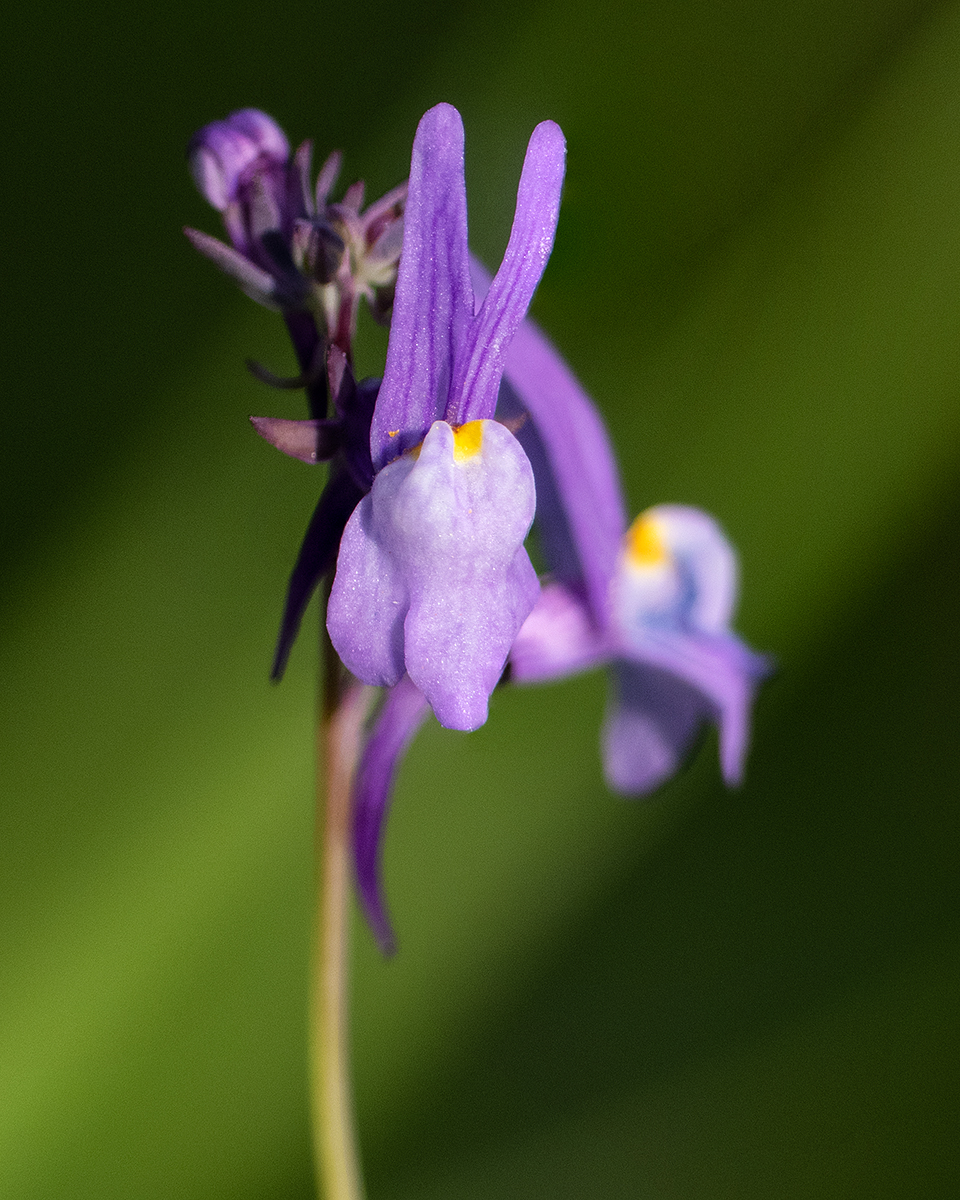
L. ricardoi at Vila Nova de São Bento-Serpa

== Distribution and habitat ==
Linaria ricardoi is endemic to southern Portugal in the interior of Alentejo but the species' main distribution area is in the Beja District (specifically in Redondo, Ferreira do Alentejo, Beja, Alvito, Cuba and Serpa). It is associated with grain fields such as wheat and oat and less commonly barley, fallows and meadows in traditional or mounted olive groves, rarely on embankments and side roads. It thrives in these areas to the reduced application of herbidices. It prefers clay and alkaline soils.

== Threats ==
It is threatened by agricultural intensification and the related increase in herbicide use starting in the 50s and intensified in the 70s. Its reduced distribution and population isolation make the species particularly vulnerable to natural and human threats. Overgrazing, botanical colectionism and droughts are other factors that can affect this plant. The conversion of traditional agriculture to intensive cultures in the region is a concerning issue, since 95% of its distribution coincides with the "Sistema Global de Rega do Alqueva", an expanding agricultural area created after the filling of the Alqueva Dam.

== Conservation ==
In 2006 QUERCUS acquired a four hectare terrain with L. ricardoi habitat where repopulation accions were performed. In 2011 it was considered to be a "Near Threatened" species by the IUCN but the "Lista Vermelha" update of 2020 classified it as "Endangered", due to the reduced EOO (2,100 km^{2} (810 sq mi)) and AOO (208 km^{2} (80 sq mi)) in only 3 locations. A decreasing number of mature individuals, area of occupation and habitat quality led to an estimated population reduction over 30%. It is a protected species by portuguese law and the European Community through Annex II & IV of the Habitats Directive, along with the Annex I of the Bern Convention.

In 2022 it was selected as the portuguese "Plant of the Year" in order to raise awareness to its conservation.
