= Linaria altaica =

Scientific classification
- Kingdom: Plantae
- Clade: Tracheophytes
- Clade: Angiosperms
- Clade: Eudicots
- Clade: Asterids
- Order: Lamiales
- Family: Plantaginaceae
- Genus: Linaria
- Species: L. altaica

Binomial name
- Linaria altaica Fischer ex Ledeb.

Synonyms
- Linaria bektauatensis Semiotr.; Linaria brachyceras (Bunge) Kuprian.; Linaria debilis Kuprian.; Linaria dmitrievae Semiotr.; Linaria loeselii var. brachyceras Bunge; Linaria loeselii var. major Bunge; Linaria loeselii var. minor Bunge; Linaria odora var. brachyceras Bunge Ledeb.; Linaria uralensis Kotov

Species of flowering plant

Linaria altaica is a species of flowering plant that was described by Fisher and Carl Friedrich von Ledebour. Linaria altaica belongs to the genus Linaria, in the family Plantaginaceae. It has no listed subspecies.

== Description ==
Perennial glabrous plant with 30 stems 15–20 cm (5.9–7.9 in) tall, branched in the lower parts, rather densely leafy. Its 4-6 leaves 11 mm (0.43 in) apart are linear, 3.5–4 cm (1.4–1.6 in) long and 1–1.5 mm (0.039–0.059 in) broad, fleshy, semicylindrical, ribbed at base, subobtuse. Inflorescence lax, 2.5–5 cm (0.98–1.97 in) long, 2–8-flowered. Pedicels mostly 5–7 mm (0.20–0.28 in) long (very rarely 3 mm (0.12 in)). Calyx subglabrous, with isolated glandular hairs at base and along margins of lobes. Corolla light yellow, 9–10 mm (0.35–0.39 in) long, with two orange stripes in throat; spur slender, pointed, straight or slightly curved, 8–9 mm (0.31–0.35 in) long. Capsule globose or slightly elongated, 4 mm (0.16 in) in diameter. Seeds smooth, with membranous margin, 2 mm (0.079 in) long.

== Distribution and habitat ==
It can be found in Russia, in East European Russia, Krasnoyarsk, Altai and Tuva, and also in Kazakhstan and Mongolia. It is present mostly in mountainous terrain.
