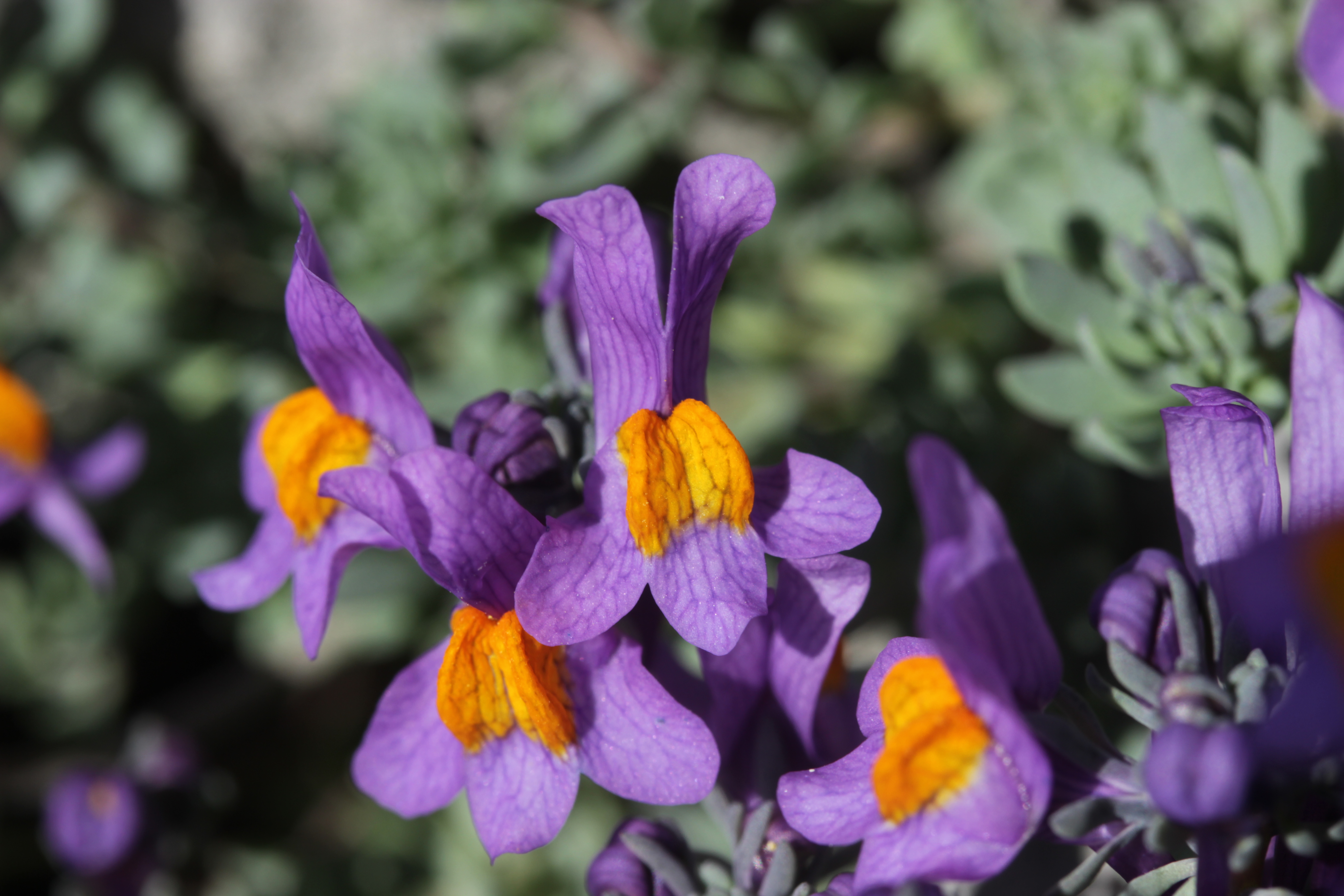
- Linaria alpina in the French Alps

Conservation status
- Least Concern (IUCN 3.1)

Scientific classification
- Kingdom: Plantae
- Clade: Embryophytes
- Clade: Tracheophytes
- Clade: Spermatophytes
- Clade: Angiosperms
- Clade: Eudicots
- Clade: Asterids
- Order: Lamiales
- Family: Plantaginaceae
- Genus: Linaria
- Species: L. alpina

Binomial name
- Linaria alpina (L.) Mill. (1768)

= Linaria alpina =

Species of flowering plant

Linaria alpina, the alpine toadflax, is a purple-flowered plant native to mountainous areas of southern and central Europe. It belongs to the family Plantaginaceae. It was first described by Carl Linnaeus, and given its current name by Philip Miller.

== Etymology ==
The generic name Linaria is derived from the Latin name for "resembling flax (linen)". It refers to the similarity of the leaves of some species in this genus to those of the common flax species, Linum usitatissimum. The specific epithet alpina indicates that the plant is of alpine origin or inhabits mountainous regions with habitats similar to alpine altitudes.

== Taxonomy ==
The family Plantaginaceae includes 12 tribes, 105 genera, and over 1,800 species. The genus Linaria belongs to the tribe Antirrhineae, which is composed of nearly 200 species distributed across North America, Europe, Africa, and Asia.

Until recently, Linaria and related genera were included in the families Scrophulariaceae or Veronicaceae depending on the author. Modern APG classification places them within the Plantaginaceae.

The scientific name of this species was initially described by Linnaeus (1707–1778) under its basionym Antirrhinum alpinum. It was later reclassified to its current name by the Scottish botanist Philip Miller (1691–1771) in the 1768 8th edition of his publication The Gardeners Dictionary.

=== Phylogeny ===
Traditionally, the spontaneous species of the Italian flora are divided into four sections; Cymbalaria, Elatinoides, Linariastrum, and Chaenarrhinum. L. alpina is included in section Linariastrum, which is distinguished by sessile leaves with pinnate venation, flowers arranged in naked terminal racemes, and corollas with the throat completely obstructed by a prominent palate.

More recent classifications have assigned the species to section Supinae. Current phylogenetic research indicates that species within the genus Linaria are distributed across six clades. L. alpina is located within the sixth clade, which, together with the fifth clade, forms a sister group representing the "core" of the genus. L. alpina and Linaria arenaria DC. form a sister group, although the seeds of the latter are crested rather than winged.

The chromosome number of L. alpina is 2n = 12.

== Description ==
Linaria alpina is a hairless herb that can behave as an annual, a biennial, or a perennial. It reaches heights of 5–15 centimetres (2–6 in), though some specimens can reach up to 20 cm (8 in). Its primary biological form is a scapose hemicryptophyte, with overwintering buds at ground level protected by snow or litter, but it can also be a scapose therophyte, surviving via seed, or a rhizomatous geophyte, relying on underground rhizomes. The plant is almost always prostrate, lying flat with only the tips ascending, and possesses a thread-like, often creeping rhizome. The entire plant is glabrous (hairless) and glaucous (waxy grey-blue).

As with many other members of the genus, Linaria alpina flowers have a blue-violet or pinkish corolla, with short spurs 8–10 mm long. The upper lip is deeply two-lobed, purple with two yellow-orange spots, and an orange throat lobes in the centre, creating a striking colour contrast and making it easily identifiable when in flower. This is likely an optical signal for insects.

=== Vegetative organs ===
- Roots: The root system tends to have a taproot.
- Stem: The aerial part of the stem is prostrate or ascending; its consistency is slender and fragile. An underground stem (rhizome type) may occasionally be present.
- Leaves: The fleshy leaves are linear to lanceolate, entire, and glaucous with a blue-green border. They measure roughly 5–20 mm long and 2–3 mm wide. Along the stem, they are subsessile and arranged in whorls of four, often becoming densely imbricate (overlapping) to form pseudo-rosettes at the apex of sterile branches. The upper leaves may transition to an alternate arrangement.

=== Inflorescence and flowers ===
Three to fifteen flowers form a sparse, dense, or capitate raceme approximately 1 cm long. Individual flowers are pedunculate, with stalks are 2–4 mm during flowering, becoming straight and accrescent, 6–12 mm long, during fruiting. The flowers are hermaphroditic, zygomorphic, and tetramerous.

- Floral formula: $X \text{ or } * K_{(4-5)}, [C_{(4) \text{ or } (2+3)}, A_{2+2 \text{ or } 2}], G_{(2)}, \text{capsule}$
- Calyx: The calyx is tubular-campanulate, more or less actinomorphic, and gamosepalous. It is formed by five deep, subequal laciniae (lobes) measuring 3–5 mm.
- Corolla: The corolla is gamopetalous, tubular, and personate (completely closed by a bulge of the upper lip). It measures 8–22 mm in total length. The posterior (upper) lip consists of two erect petals, while the anterior lip consists of three reflected petals. It is typically deep violet or pinkish with two striking orange patches on the lower lip. An abaxial spur (or sac) is present at the throat, measuring 6–7 mm in length.
- Androecium: The androecium is formed by four didynamous stamens (two long, two short), all of which are fertile. The filaments are adnate to the base of the corolla and are included or only slightly protruding. The anthers consist of two distinct, divaricate thecae that form a ring-like structure. Dehiscence is longitudinal, and the pollen grains are tricolporate. Nectar is located in the spur and is only accessible to insects strong enough to enter the closed throat.
- Gynoecium: The gynoecium is bicarpellary (syncarpous). The ovary is superior with axile placentation and ranges from ovoid to subglobose. The ovules per locule are numerous, have a single tegument, and are tenuinucellate (nucellus reduced to a few cells). The style has a stigma ranging from capitate to strongly bilobed.

=== Fruit and seeds ===
The fruit is a porocidal capsule (3–5 mm), nearly twice as long as the calyx. At maturity, it opens via two apical opercula (holes). The seeds are numerous and discoid, with a membranous wing (winged seeds).

Flowering period: Throughout the summer, from June to August, sometimes extending into September.

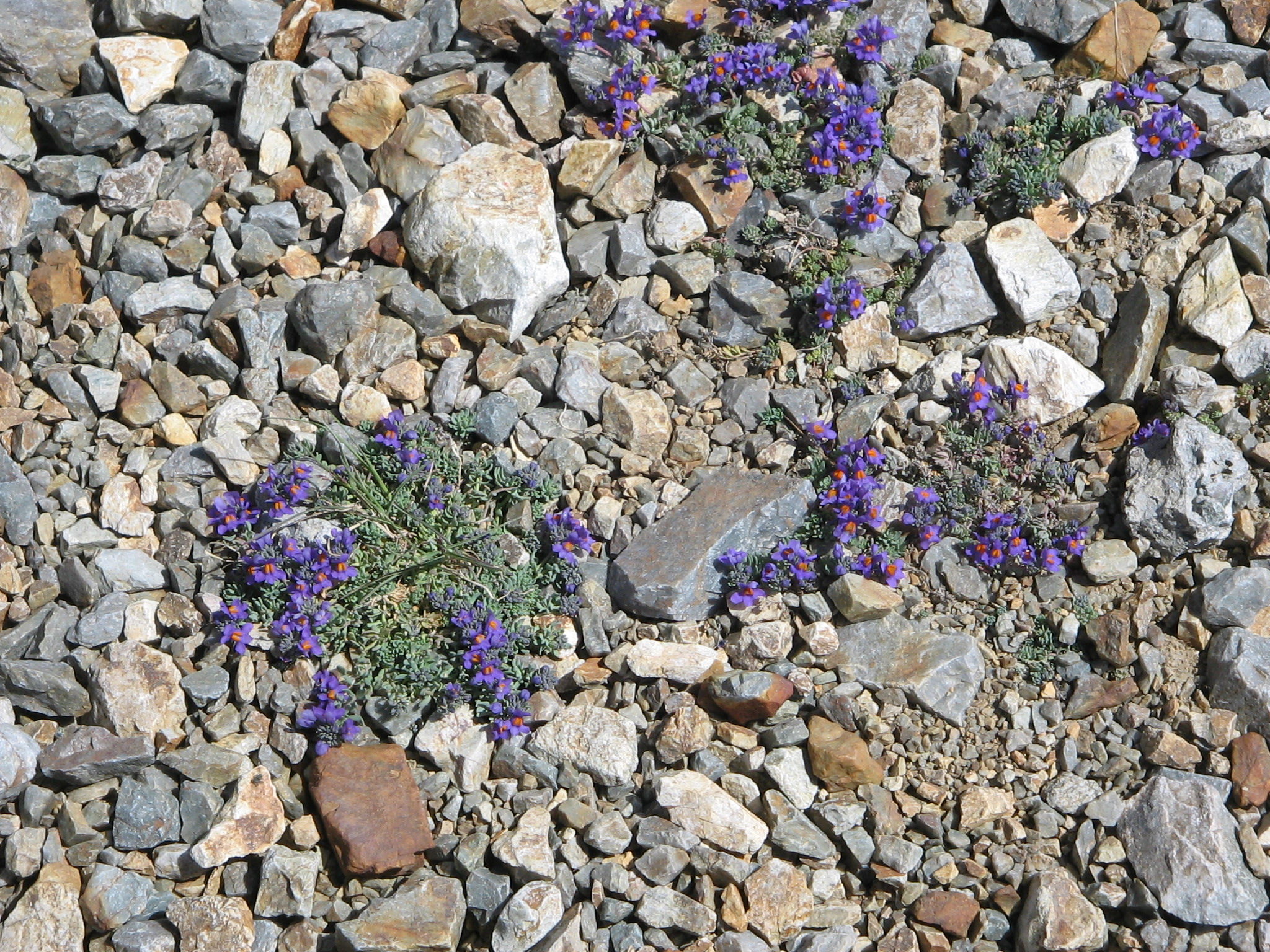
L. alpina in rocky soil.

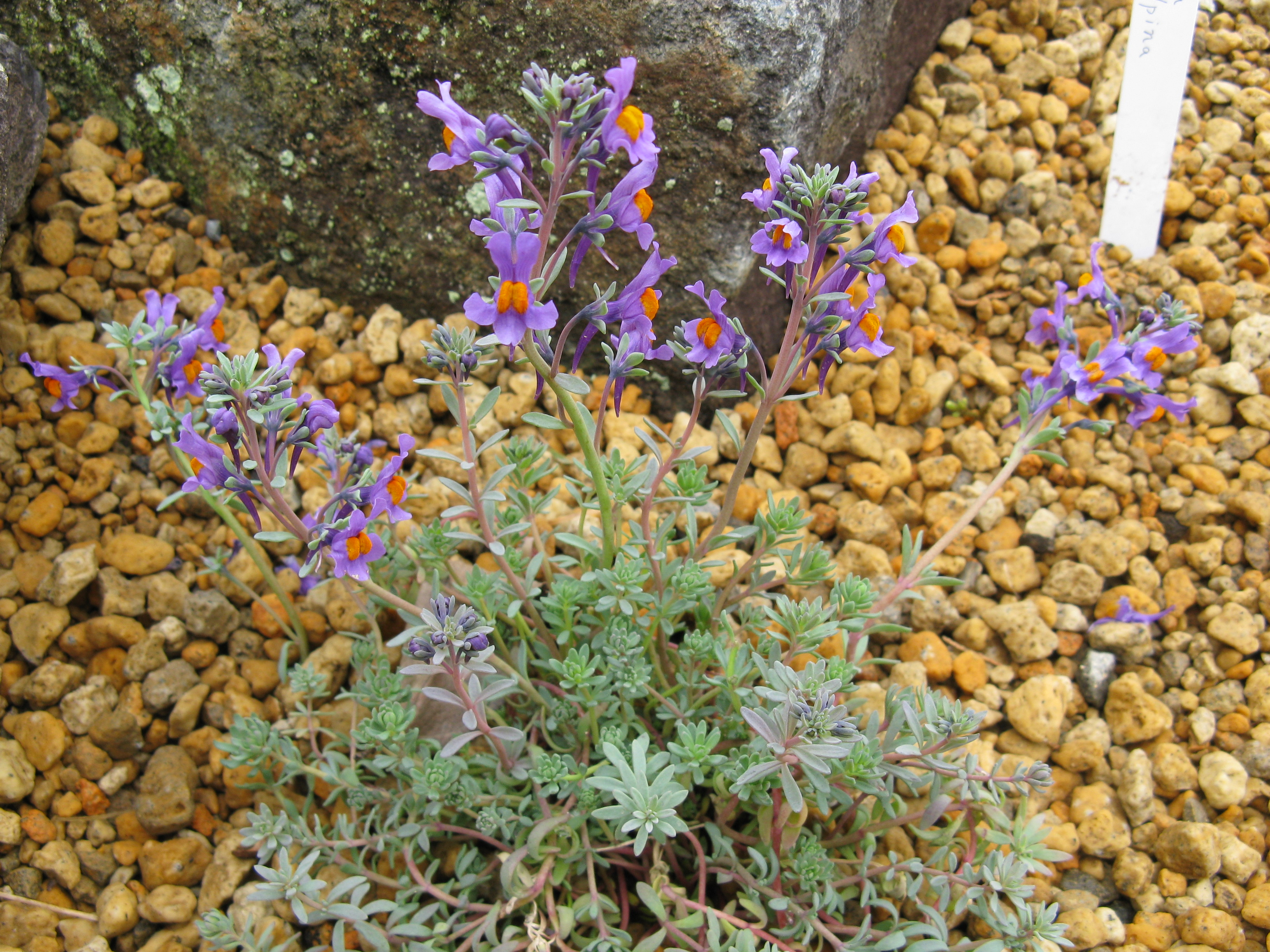
L. alpina in a botanical garden.

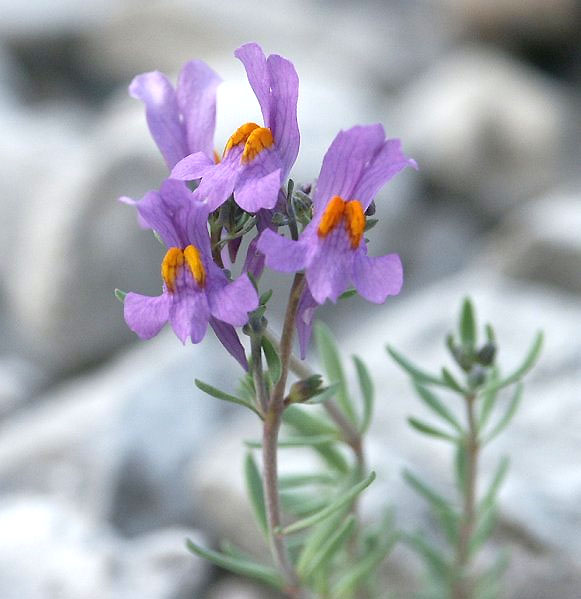
L. alpina corollas.

== Distribution ==
It is found in many mountain ranges in southern and central Europe ranging from Spain to Romania between 1,500 and 3,800 metres, and in valleys with altitudes of up to 4,200 m. They inhabit the alpine and nival vegetation levels, and partially the subalpine, montane, and hilly levels.

In Spain it is found in the Sierra de Gredos, the Montes de León and the Pyrenees. There is also a record in the Valencian Country at 1,200 m altitude in the highest part of the Alt Palància region.

In France, it is found in the Jura, in several locations in Savoie and Haute-Savoie, in the Mercantour Park (up to over 2,800 m), in the Pyrenees, and in two locations in Burgundy. It is also found in other parts of the Alps (giving it its name), notably on the peaks of Champsaur (Hautes-Alpes).

In Italy besides the Alps it is also found in the central Apennine Mountains. In Friuli, near Sagrado along the Isonzo river, these plants can grow down to the plains.

It is a common species in Austria, Liechtenstein, Switzerland and northern Slovenia.

In Germany, the species is primarily distributed throughout the Bavarian Alps. Scattered occurrences, known as "Alpenschwemmling" (alpine drifters), are found in the Alpine foothills along the Lech and Isar rivers, reaching as far as Landsberg am Lech and Munich. It is considered extinct in the southeast of Baden-Württemberg.

It also has smaller recorded occurrences across the Balkans in Croatia on Paklenica national park, in Bosnia and Herzegovina's Blidinje plateau, in Montenegro, in Albania's Nikaj-Mërtur natural park and as far south as Greece.

It is also found in Romania's Piatra Craiului national park.

In Slovakia, it is washed down by the Belá River near Liptovský Hrádok. In the Czech Republic, the species also occurs grow naturally.

In Slovakia, it is classified as a critically endangered taxon. The only original locality where it occurs today is Smutná dolina in the Western Tatras, where only a few clumps are known in difficult-to-access areas.

== Habitat and ecology ==
It is an early colonist of newly exposed, unconsolidated glacial moraine. The typical habitat for this plant includes scree slopes (ghiaioni), limestone debris, stony ground, and ruins. The preferred substrate is calcareous (limestone) but also siliceous, with a neutral-basic pH. The soil typically has low nutritional value and must remain moist. It is a calciphilous (lime-loving) plant, it inhabits the gravelly banks of mountain streams and is often washed down to lower elevations by water; for example, it reaches Lake Constance via the deposits of the Rhine, and there are older records of its occurrence on the deposits of the Danube. It tolerates constant burial by scree material well. A single underground rhizome can have up to 60 rootless shoots that penetrate coarse scree or lie on top of fine scree.

Pollination of the flowers can only be performed by heavy insects with enough strength to open the flowers such as hymenopterans (bees and wasps), lepidopterans (butterflies and moths), or dipterans (flies). Alternatively, pollination can occur via the wind (anemophilous pollination). Because the nectar is located deep within the flower, it can only be reached by insects with a long proboscis, making it accessible primarily to bumblebees.

The seeds are often carried away by rivers, snow melt and debry flows (mures) which means they can also be found on gravel banks along mountain streams. The dispersal of seeds can also occur through the wind (anemochory). Once the seeds have fallen to the ground, they are further dispersed primarily by insects, specifically ants (myrmecochory). The seeds are light germinators, for successful growth, seeds should be covered with less than 1 cm of soil so they can receive sunlight.

It is a creeping plant that is able to stabilise debris by forming many non-rooting shoots. These shoots grow between and over the stones.

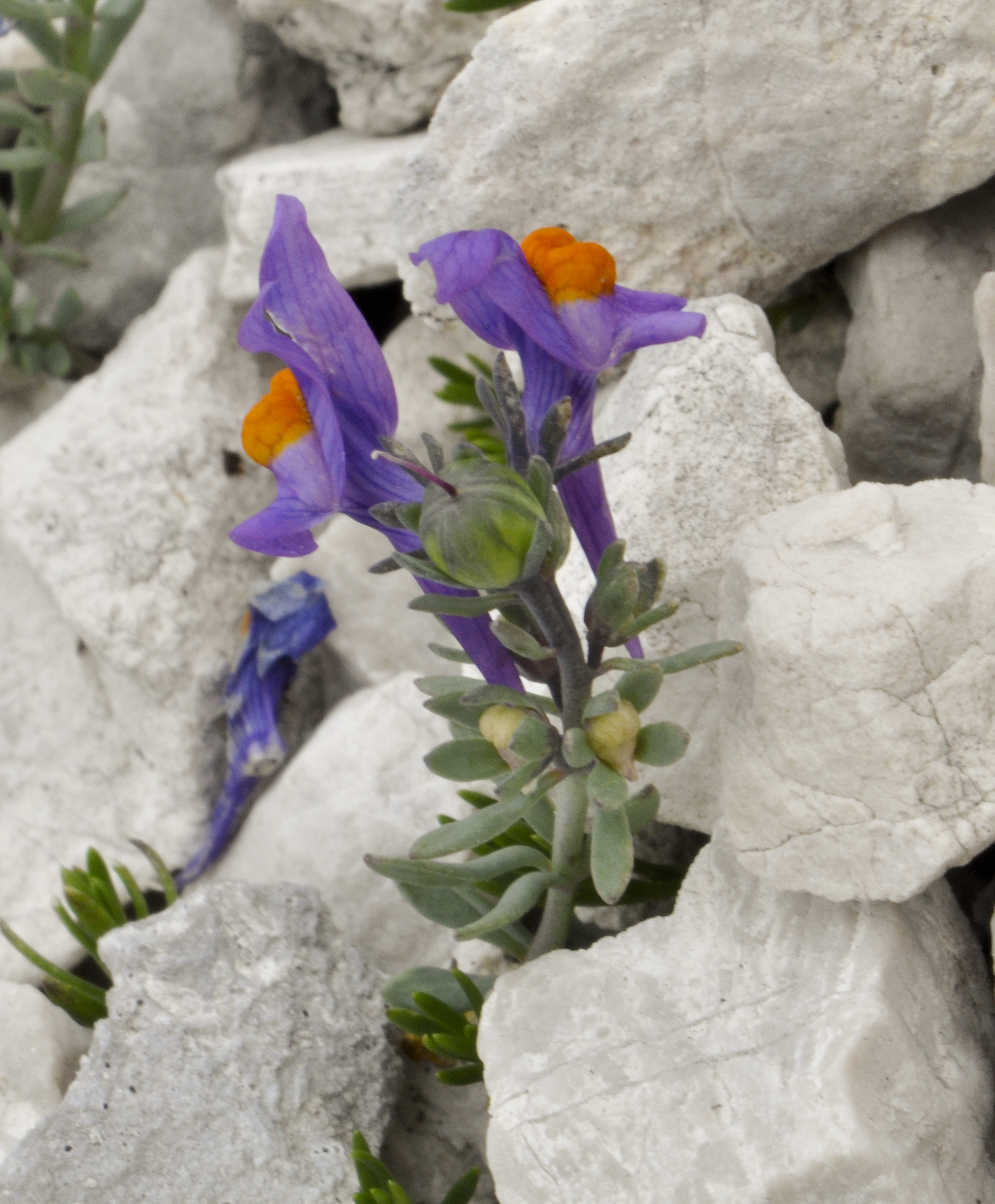
Linaria alpina in rocky cliffs

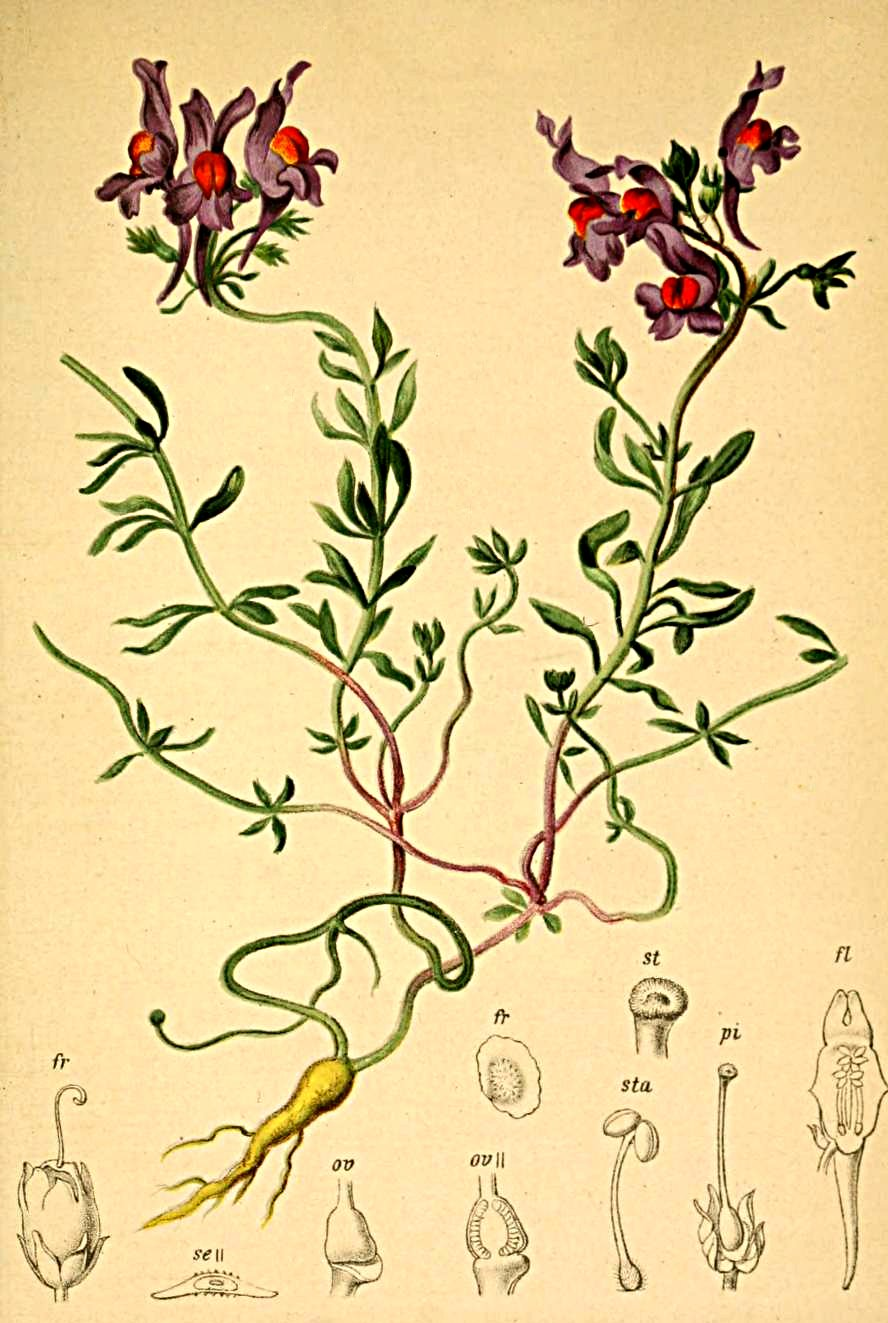
Linaria alpina technical drawing

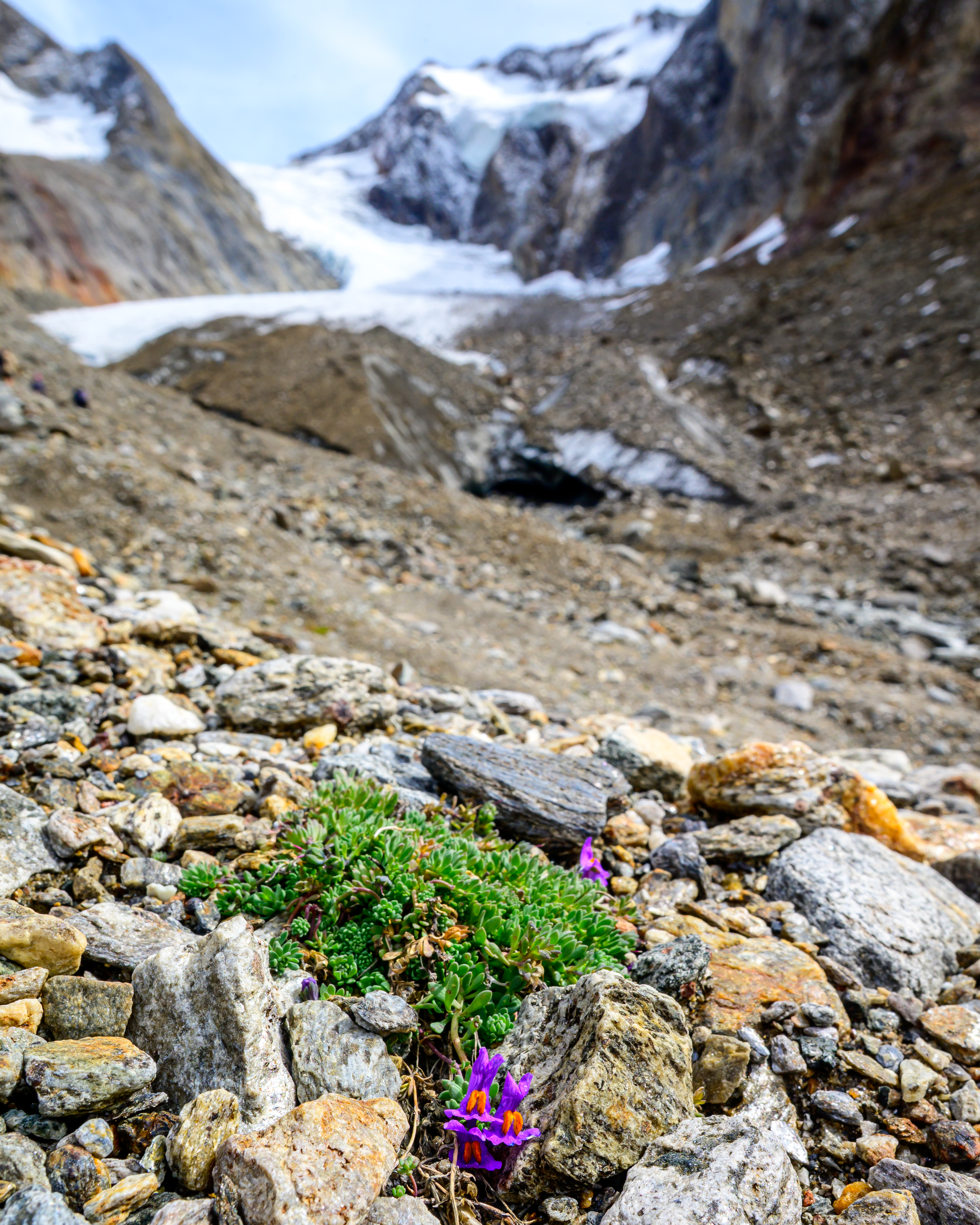
Linaria alpina in Gaisbergtal

== Conservation ==
In France, this species is protected in the Burgundy region (Article 1). In Switzerland, its IUCN status is NT (Near Threatened) in the Jura; it is fully protected in the cantons of Appenzell Innerrhoden, Neuchâtel, and Vaud.

== Subspecies ==
The species is divided into the following subspecies:

- L. a. subsp. alpina (L.) Mill., 1768
- L. a. subsp. filicaulis (Boiss. ex Leresche & Levier) M.Laínz, 1962
- L. a. subsp. petraea (Jord.) H.Marcailhou & A.Marcailhou, 1908
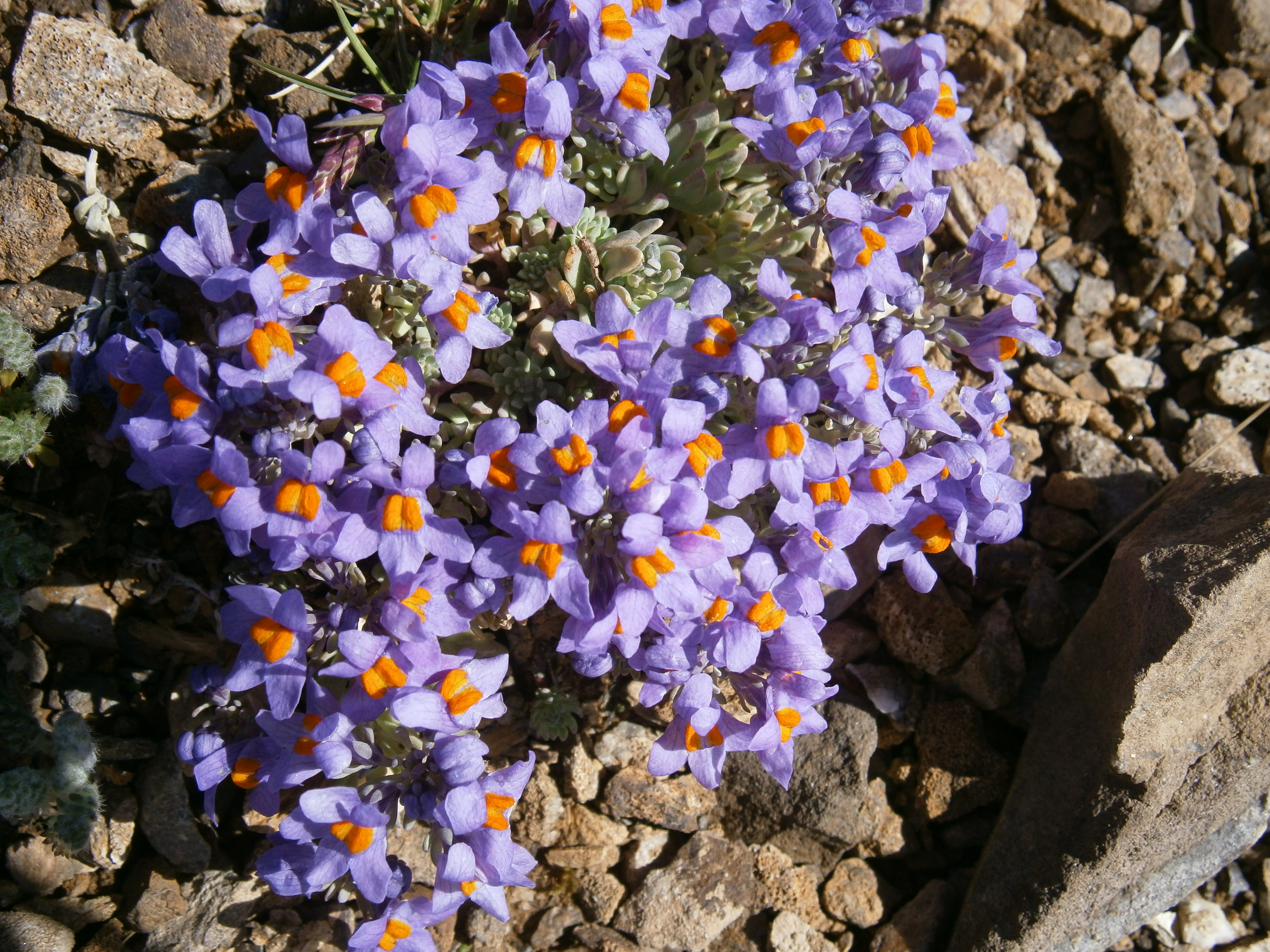
Linaria alpina subsp. alpina

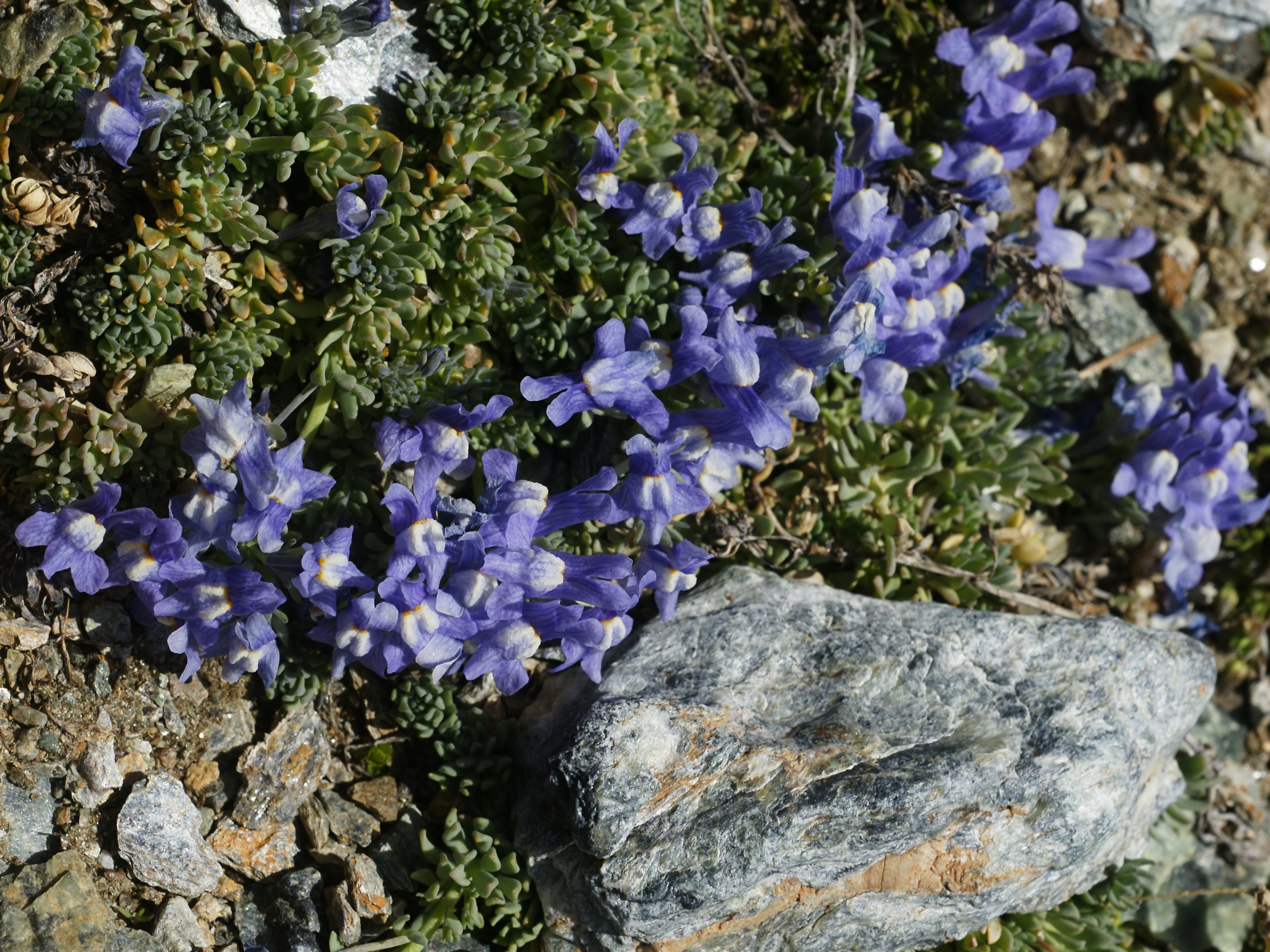
Linaria alpina subsp. petraea

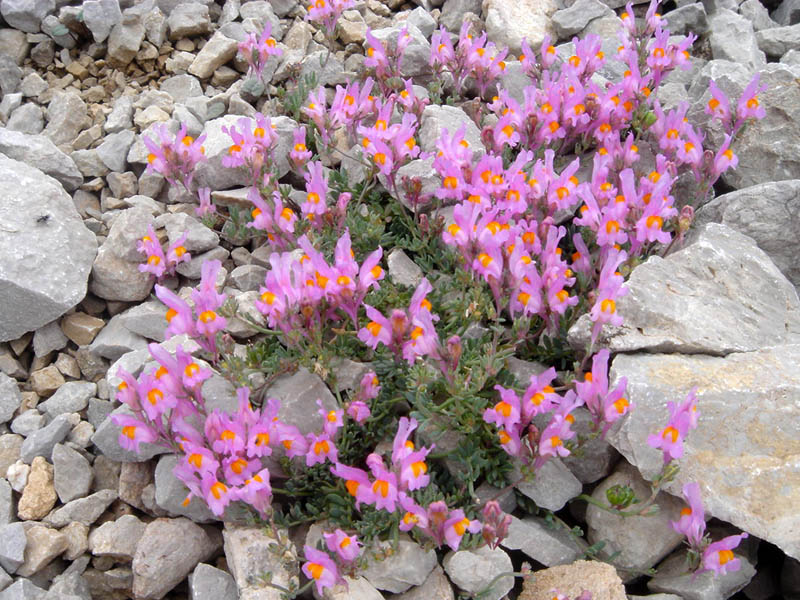
Linaria alpina subsp. filicaulis.
- Common alpine toadflax (L. a. subsp. alpina): Low-lying plants 3 to 10 cm tall. Featuring reflexed corolla lobes; the upper lips of the corolla are twice as long as their width. Distributed in Germany and Austria (except for Burgenland and Vienna).
- Upright alpine toadflax (L. a. subsp. petraea): The rare rock toadflax, found mainly in Switzerland, characterised by single-coloured violet forms, and an arching, ascending plant usually 10 to 20 cm tall. With lanceolate corolla lobes; the lobes of the corolla lips are two to three times longer than they are wide. Occurs in Upper and Lower Austria and Styria.

== Common names ==
- Deutsch: Alpen-Leinkraut / Stanklitter / Grießspeik·
- English: Alpine toadflax ·
- Español: Palomilla alpina ·
- Français : Linaire des Alpes / Muflier des Alpes / Gueule-de-lion des Alpes ·
- Hornjoserbsce: Hórski lenčk ·
- Nederlands: Alpenleeuwenbek ·
- Polski: Lnica alpejska ·
- Slovenščina: Alpska madronščica ·

== Synonyms ==
The following synonyms are listed:

- Antirrhinum alpinum Linné
- Cymbalaria alpina (Mill.) Rafin.
- Linaria alpina subsp. aciculifolia Braun-Blanq
- Linaria alpina var. angustifolia Lange
- Linaria alpina var. cyanea Arcangeli
- Linaria alpina var. diffusa Rouy
- Linaria alpina var. erecta (Chav.) Rouy
- Linaria alpina var. flaviflora Lange
- Linaria alpina var. petraea (Jordan) Béguinot
- Linaria alpina var. pilosa Fouc.
- Linaria alpina f. pilosa (Fouc.) Valdés
- Linaria alpina subsp. petraea (Jordan) Rouy
- Linaria benearnensis Rouy
- Linaria benearnensis (Rouy) Prain.
- Linaria petraea Jordan
- Linaria violacea Gesner ex Bubani
