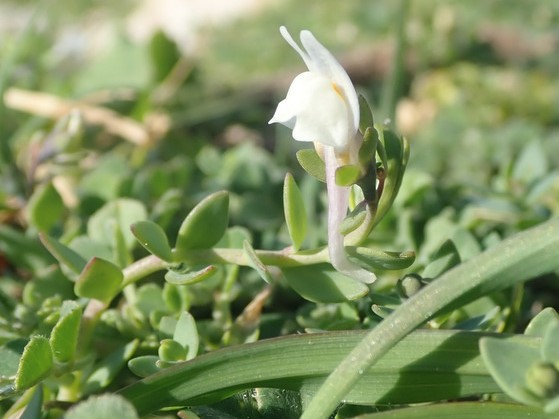

Scientific classification
- Kingdom: Plantae
- Clade: Tracheophytes
- Clade: Angiosperms
- Clade: Eudicots
- Clade: Asterids
- Order: Lamiales
- Family: Plantaginaceae
- Genus: Linaria
- Species: L. pseudolaxiflora

Binomial name
- Linaria pseudolaxiflora Lojac. (1907)

Synonyms
- Linaria reflexa f. melitensis Viano (1978)

= Linaria pseudolaxiflora =

Species of plant

Linaria pseudolaxiflora, the Maltese toadflax, is a species of flowering plant in the family Plantaginaceae. It is native to Malta and the islands of Linosa and Lampedusa. It is listed as vulnerable by IUCN.

== Sources ==
This article incorporates text from a free content work. Licensed under CC0 (license statement/permission). Text taken from Linaria pseudolaxiflora. Encyclopedia of Life.
