= Linaria volgensis =

Scientific classification
- Kingdom: Plantae
- Clade: Embryophytes
- Clade: Tracheophytes
- Clade: Angiosperms
- Clade: Eudicots
- Clade: Asterids
- Order: Lamiales
- Family: Plantaginaceae
- Genus: Linaria
- Species: L. volgensis

Binomial name
- Linaria volgensis Rakov & Tzvelev

Species of flowering plant

Linaria volgensis is a species of flowering plant in the family Plantaginaceae, native to central European Russia. It is a narrow endemic restricted to a rare type of steppe characterized by a soil of mixed chalk and sand.
