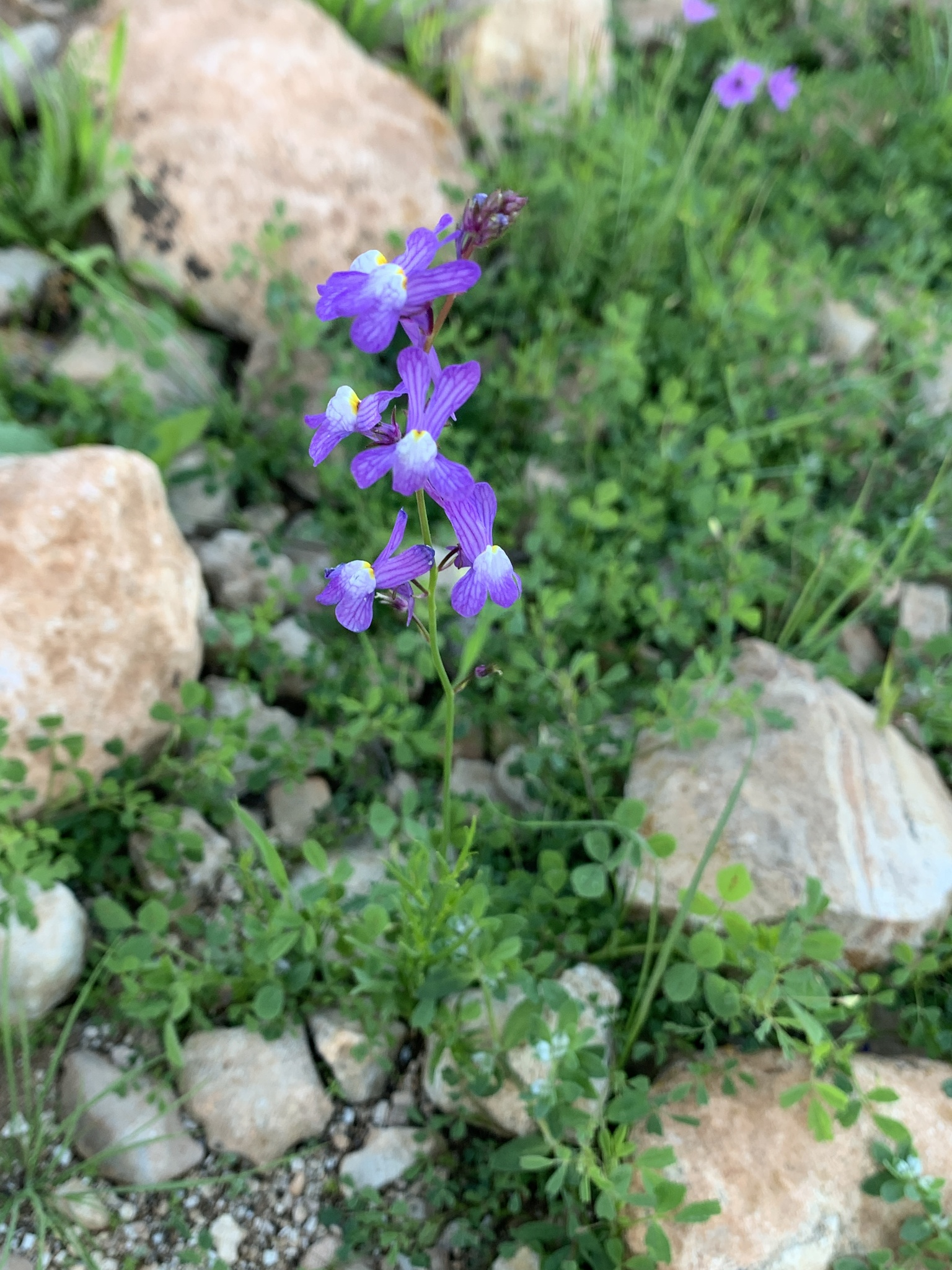
- Linaria bipartita at Aourir near Agadir, Morocco

Scientific classification
- Kingdom: Plantae
- Clade: Embryophytes
- Clade: Tracheophytes
- Clade: Spermatophytes
- Clade: Angiosperms
- Clade: Eudicots
- Clade: Asterids
- Order: Lamiales
- Family: Plantaginaceae
- Genus: Linaria
- Species: L. bipartita

Binomial name
- Linaria bipartita (Vent.) Willd.

= Linaria bipartita =

Species of flowering plant

Linaria bipartita (cloven-flowered toadflax or clovenlip toadflax) is a species of flowering plant in the plantain family native and endemic to Morocco. It is currently recognised as a distinct species by the Plants of the World Online database, though it has also been treated by some authors as a synonym of the related Iberian species Linaria incarnata.

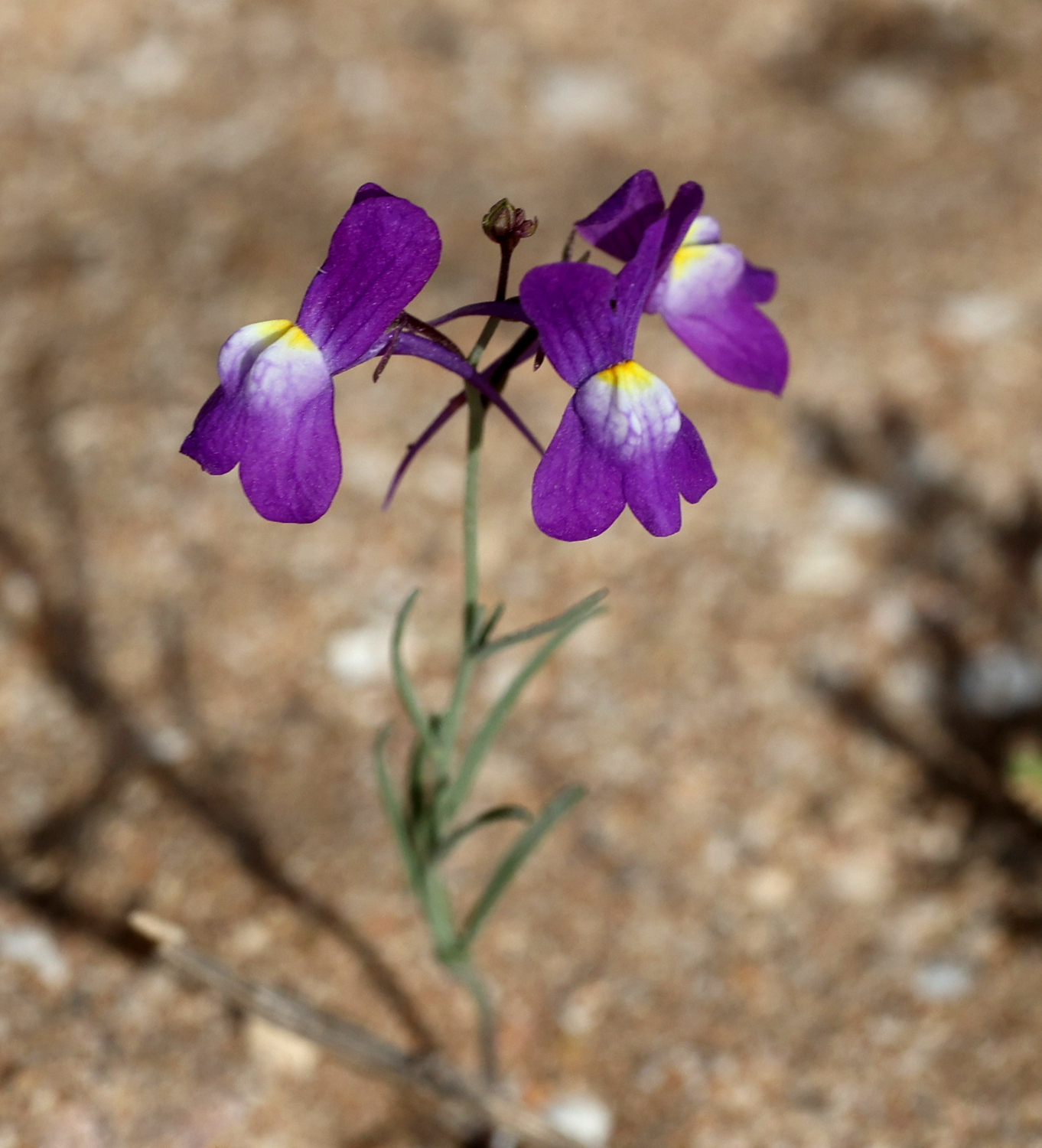
Close-up of the flowers; Tamri, Morocco

It is an annual herb growing 10 to 45 cm tall with linear leaves 3–5 cm in length. The inflorescence is a raceme of flowers occupying the top of the stem. The flowers are scented, reddish purple with a yellow-tipped white central spot, about 2 cm long, with five lobes arranged into two lips, and with a spur at the end; the top two lobes are deeply divided, giving the plant its scientific and vernacular names. The fruit is a spherical capsule about 2 mm wide.

It is sometimes cultivated as an ornamental plant, and is naturalised in some areas.
