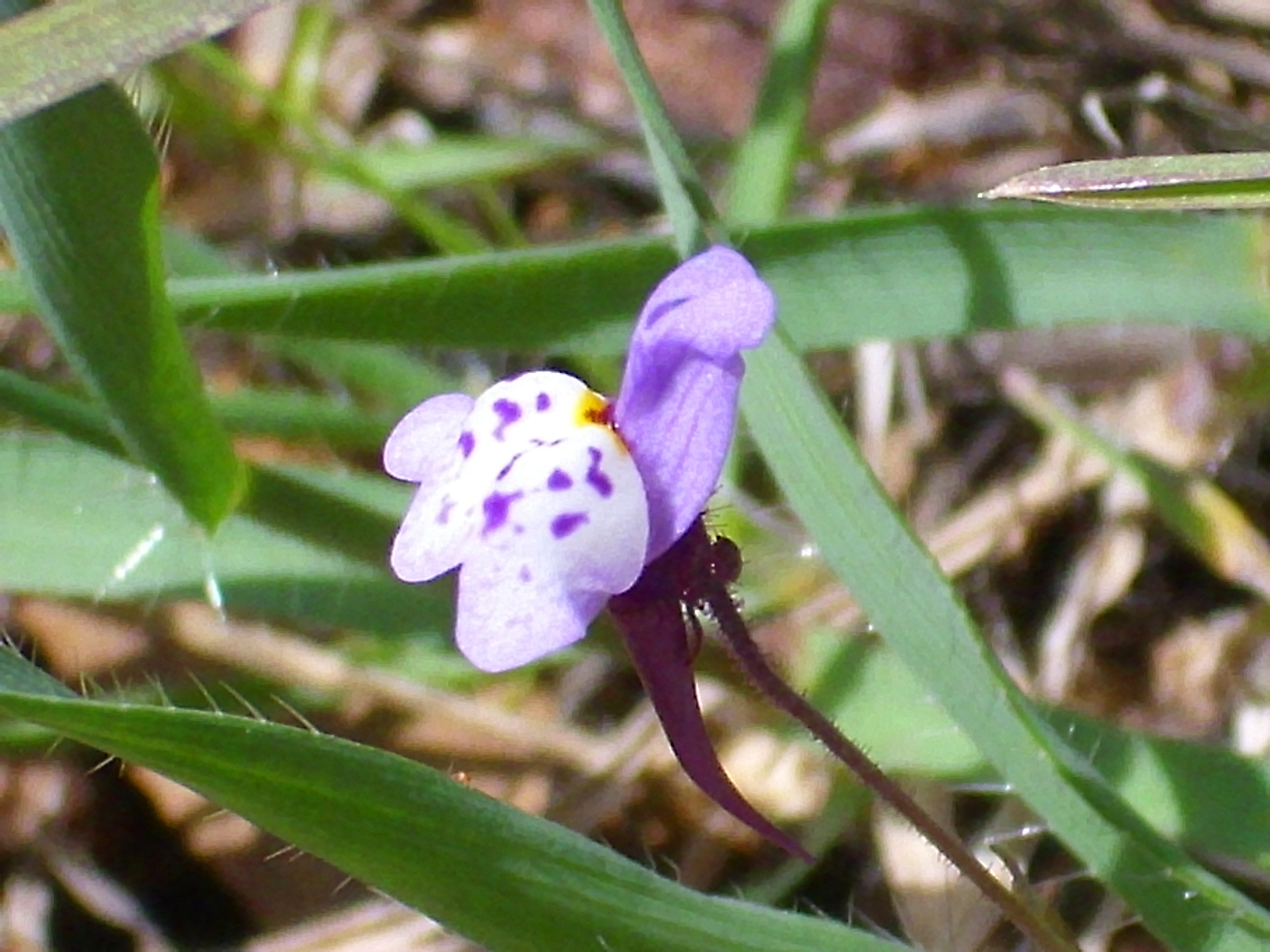

Scientific classification
- Kingdom: Plantae
- Clade: Embryophytes
- Clade: Tracheophytes
- Clade: Spermatophytes
- Clade: Angiosperms
- Clade: Eudicots
- Clade: Asterids
- Order: Lamiales
- Family: Plantaginaceae
- Genus: Linaria
- Species: L. amethystea

Binomial name
- Linaria amethystea (Lam.) Hoffmanns & Link

= Linaria amethystea =

Species of flowering plant

Linaria amethystea is a species of annual flowering plant in the family Plantaginaceae, native to the Iberian Peninsula and northwest Africa. It grows primarily in temperate biomes in Portugal, Spain, Morocco and Western Sahara.

== Description ==
A small plant with 1–25 erect bluish-green stems, 3–38 cm (1.2–15.0 in) long, with oblanceolate leaves in the same bluish-green, the lower ones sprawl many from a single point, and the upper ones alternate along the stem; the leaves are glabrous below, and thinly hairy with violet hairs above.

It blooms in spring, from February to April, and its flowers are either solitary or in groups of up to eight (rarely 15) at the edge of the stem; they have a two-lipped corolla, the upper one long and narrow amethyst-blue and the inferior one domed almost white with blue spots and a long spur all the way down, also amethyst. As a whole, the flower section comprises almost 25% of the plant's full length. It also has three different subspecies in yellow hues. The fruit is a 3–5 mm capsule containing several seeds, each with a disc-like wing.

== Taxonomy and distribution ==
Six subspecies of L. amethystea are recognised by the Plants of the World Online (POWO) database:

- Linaria amethystea subsp. aedoi J.F.Jiménez, Sánchez-Gómez, D.López, J.B.Vera & Güemes — Spain
- Linaria amethystea subsp. albiflora (Boiss.) Casim.-Sor.Solanas & Cabezudo — Spain
- Linaria amethystea subsp. amethystea — Portugal and Spain
- Linaria amethystea subsp. broussonetii (Poir.) Malato-Beliz — Morocco and Western Sahara
- Linaria amethystea subsp. multipunctata (Brot.) Chater & D.A.Webb — Morocco, Portugal and Spain
- Linaria amethystea subsp. toloxense Casim.-Sor.Solanas & Cabezudo — Spain

Some authors accept an additional subspecies L. a. subsp. ignescens, but this is considered a synonym of nominate L. a. subsp. amethystea by the POWO database.

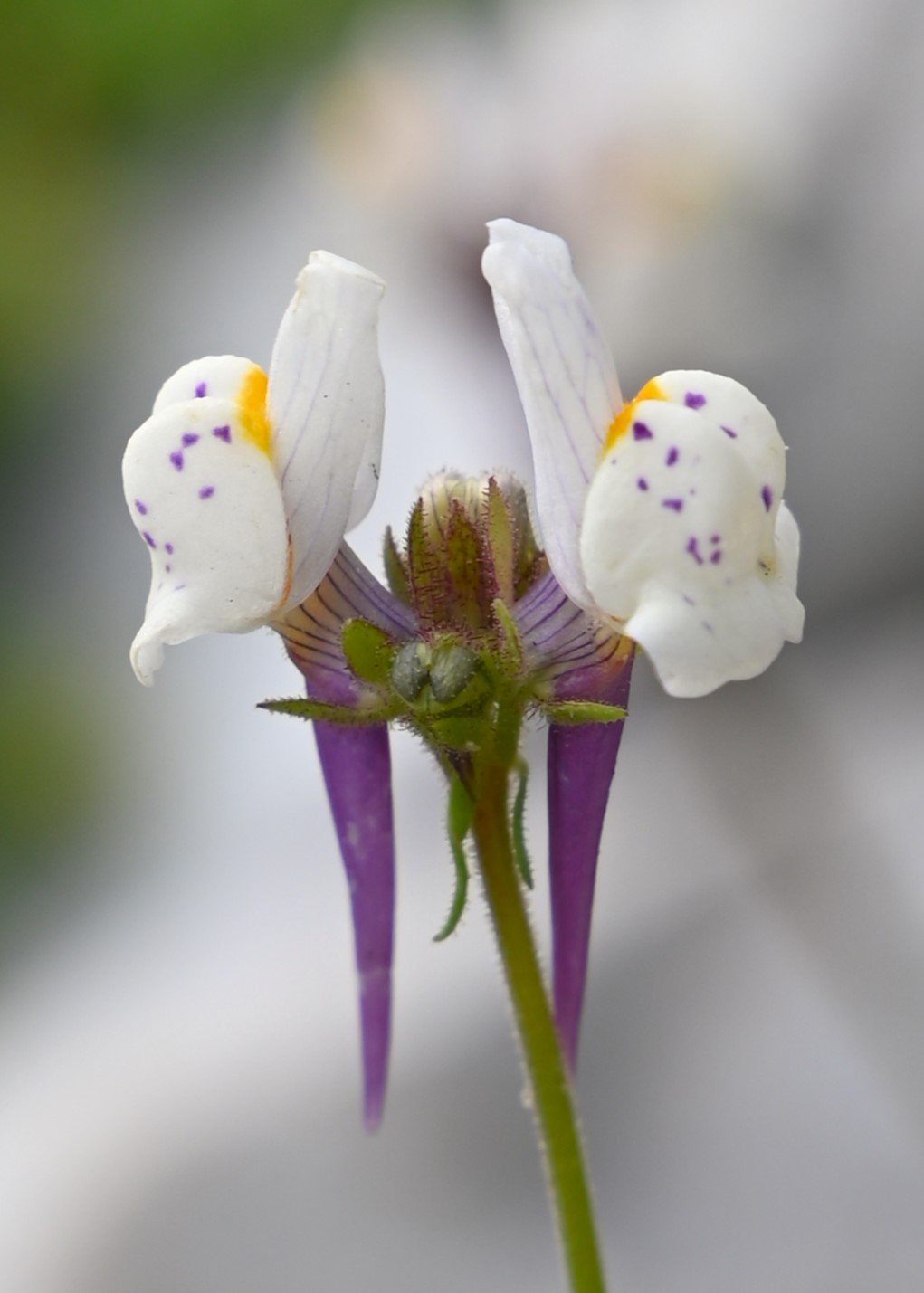
Linaria amethystea subsp. albiflora

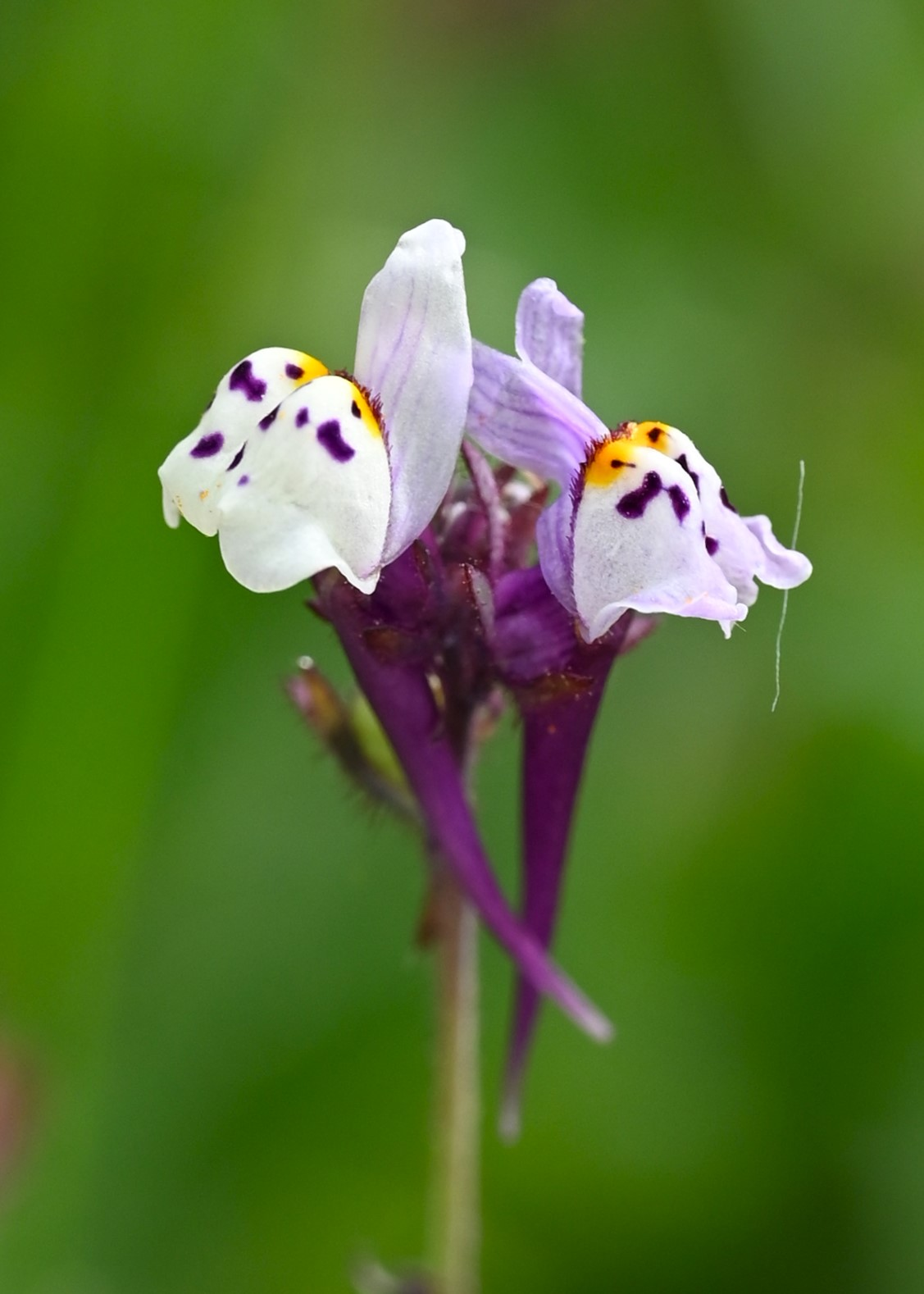
Linaria amethystea subsp. amethystea

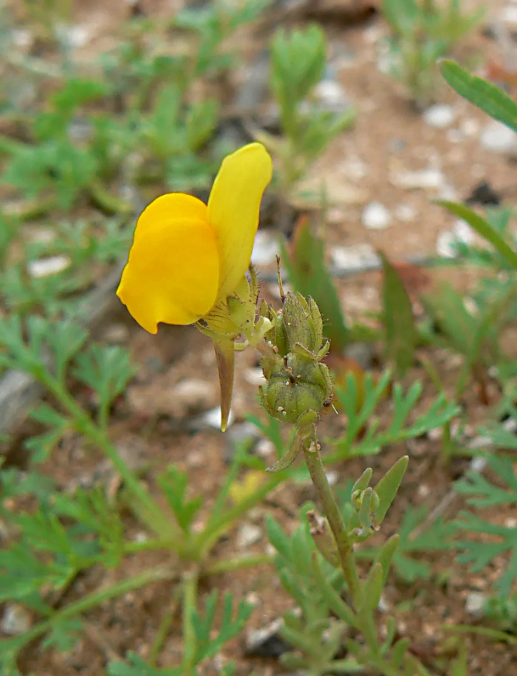
Linaria amethystea subsp. broussonetii

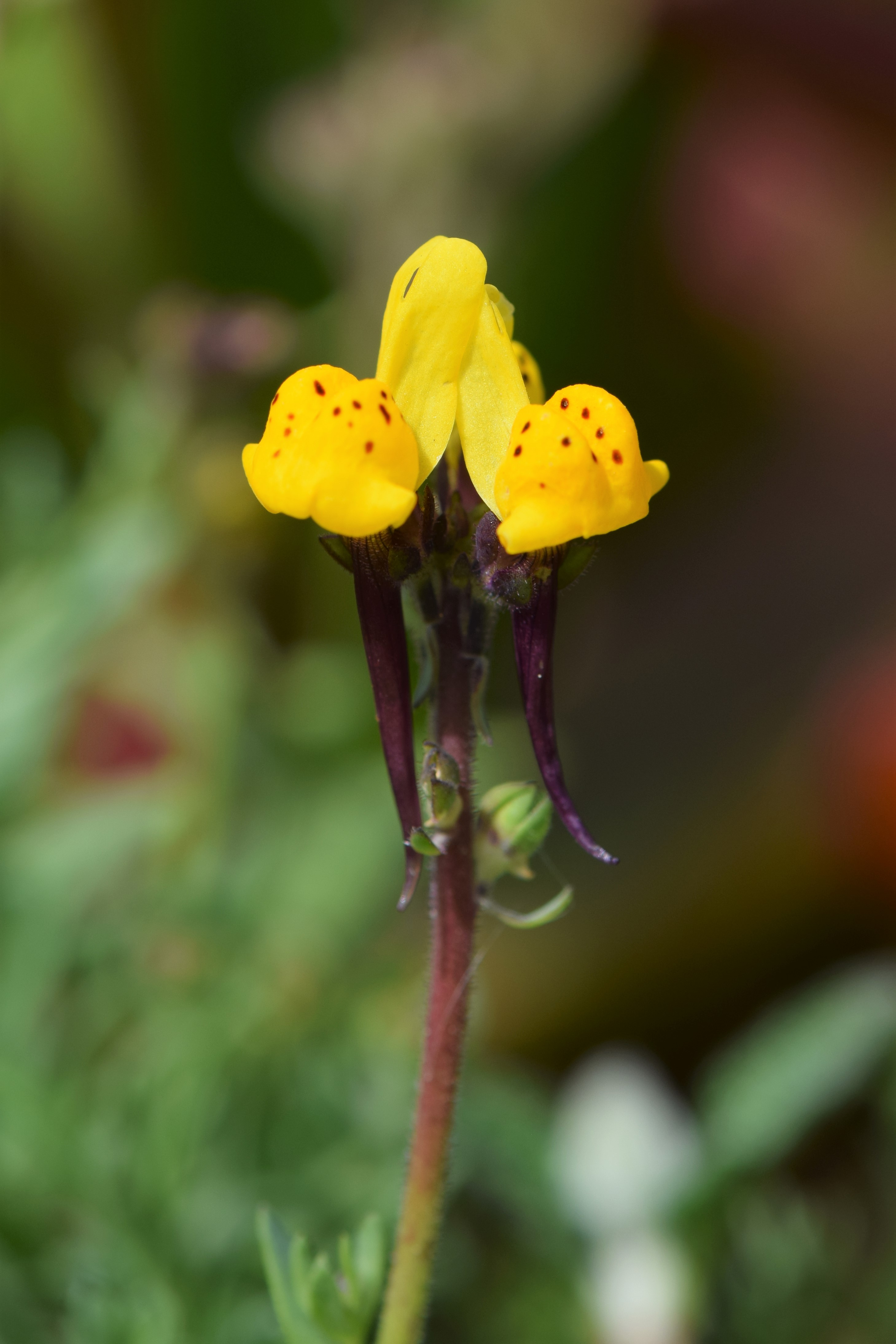
Linaria amethystea subsp. multipunctata

In Portugal, L. a. subsp. multipunctata can be found in annual fields, in olive tree groves and fruit tree groves. It has three subpopulations in the Coimbra region, around Cadaval and northern Lisbon. Smaller observations have been made on the coast of Sintra and the Berlengas islands. L. a. subsp. amethystea has a larger dispersion in the same habitats as L. a. subsp. multipunctata but also on roadsides, in clearings and in sandy areas near the shore. It is present across Portugal with populations around Trás-os-Montes, Beira Baixa, Alentejo and Algarve. According to Lista Vermelha da Flora Vascular de Portugal Continental, both L. a. subsp. amethystea and L. a. subsp. multipunctata do not have enough information to be classified under the IUCN criteria (DD-Data Deficient).

In Spain, L. a. subsp. amethystea can be found in Meseta Central, Andalusia, Extremadura and Galicia, being absent from the eastern and southestern parts of the country.
