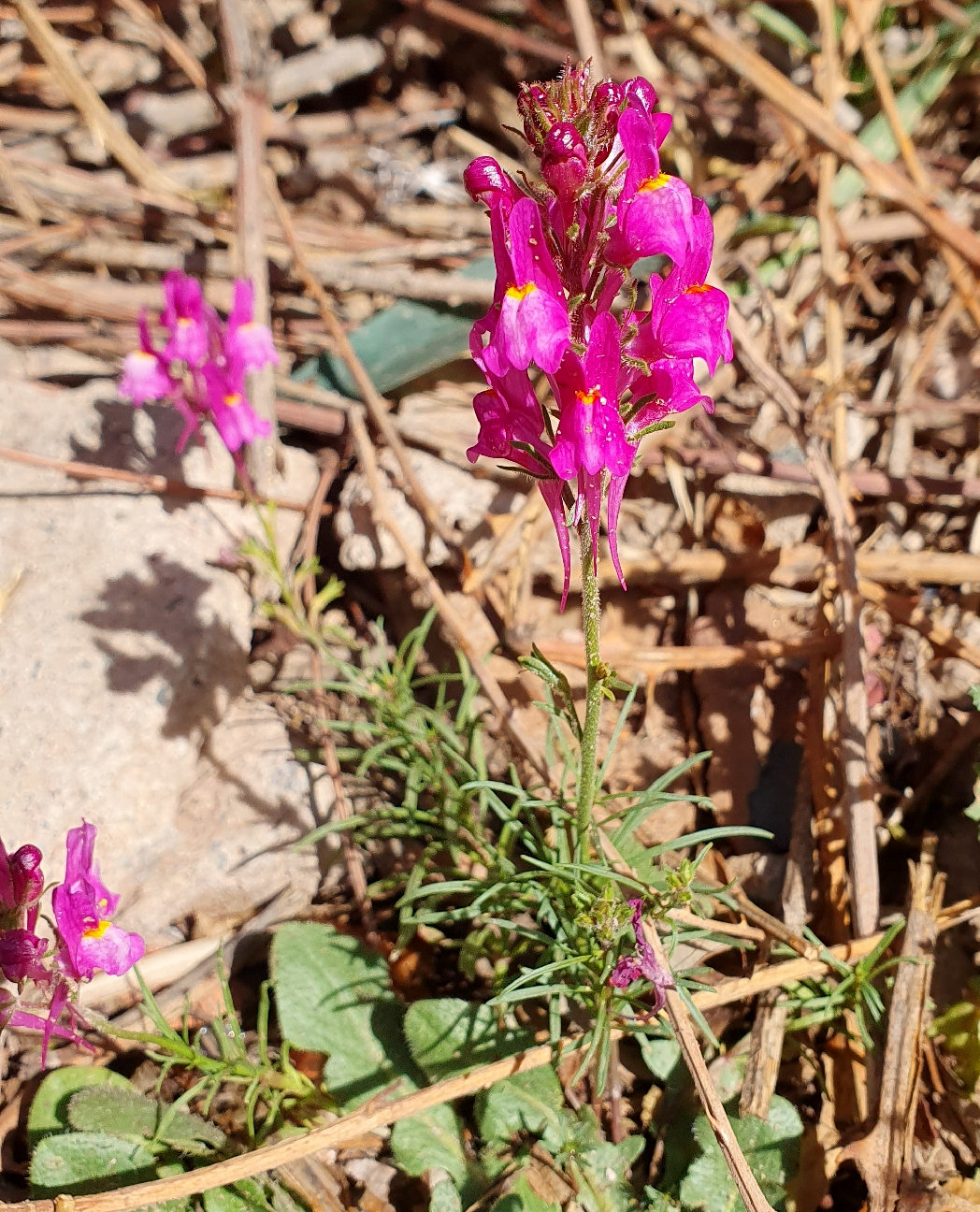
- Linaria maroccana in the central Atlas Mountains of Morocco

Scientific classification
- Kingdom: Plantae
- Clade: Embryophytes
- Clade: Tracheophytes
- Clade: Spermatophytes
- Clade: Angiosperms
- Clade: Eudicots
- Clade: Asterids
- Order: Lamiales
- Family: Plantaginaceae
- Genus: Linaria
- Species: L. maroccana

Binomial name
- Linaria maroccana Hook.f.

= Linaria maroccana =

Species of flowering plant

Linaria maroccana is a species of flowering plant in the plantain family known by the common names annual toadflax and Moroccan toadflax. It is endemic to Morocco.

It is an annual herb growing erect to a height of 40 cm (16 in), its stem with linear to elliptic leaves 2–4 cm (0.8–1.6 in) long. The inflorescence is a raceme of flowers occupying the top of the stem. At the base of each flower is a calyx with five narrow, pointed lobes. The flower is 15–20 mm (0.6–0.8 in) long with five lobes arranged into two lips with a straight spur at the back. The flower is violet-purple, with a small yellow or white spot near the throat.

It is readily available as an ornamental plant for the flower garden, though many cultivated plants are hybrids with other closely related species. As an introduced species it has become locally naturalised, including in Great Britain, and California.

The cultivar group Fairy Bouquet has gained the Royal Horticultural Society's Award of Garden Merit. Dwarf cultivars are also available.
