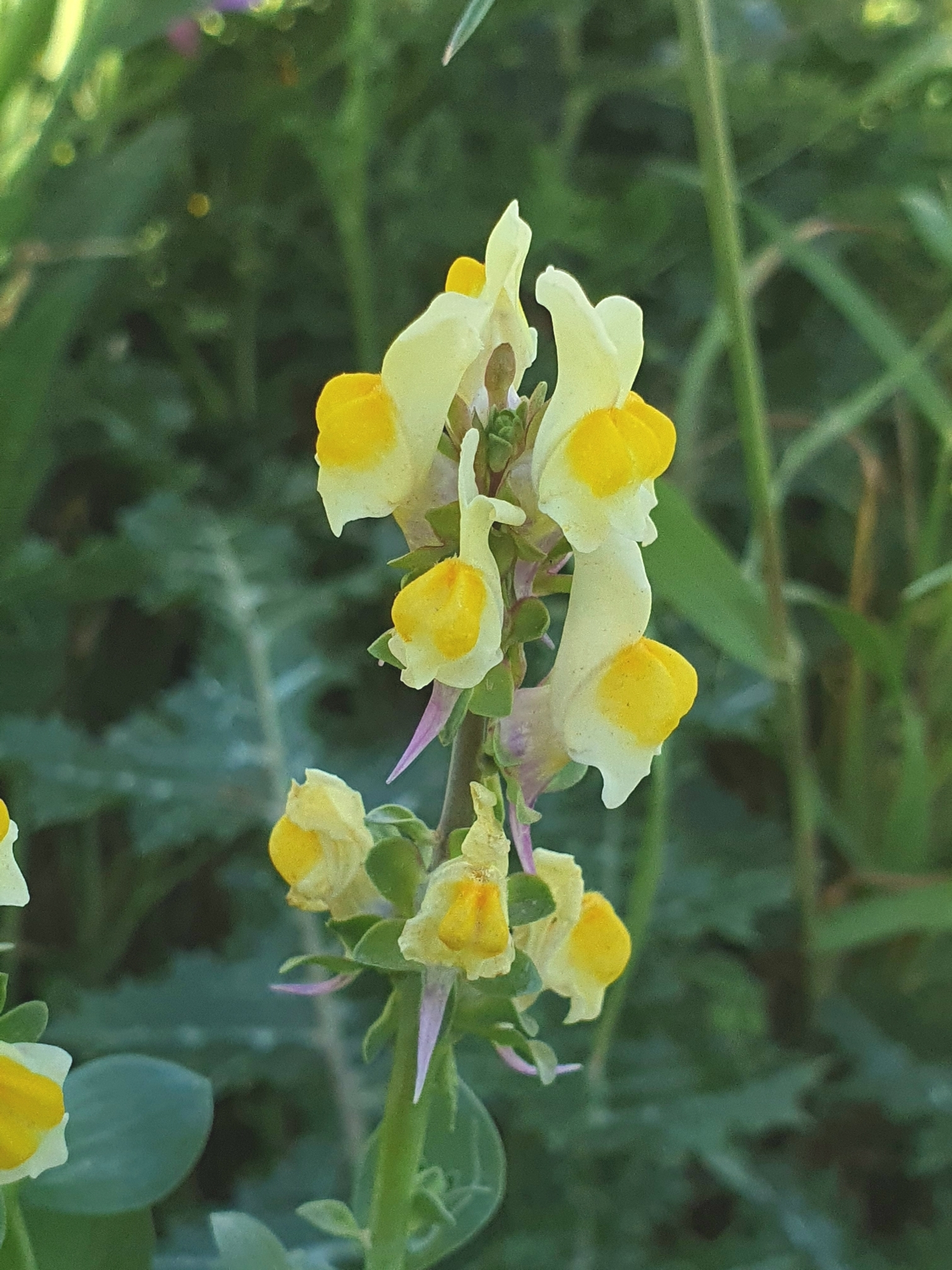

Scientific classification
- Kingdom: Plantae
- Clade: Tracheophytes
- Clade: Angiosperms
- Clade: Eudicots
- Clade: Asterids
- Order: Lamiales
- Family: Plantaginaceae
- Genus: Linaria
- Species: L. triphylla

Binomial name
- Linaria triphylla (L.) Mill.

= Linaria triphylla =

Species of plant

Linaria triphylla is a species of plants in the family Plantaginaceae.

== Sources ==
This article incorporates text from a free content work. Licensed under CC0 (license statement/permission). Text taken from Linaria triphylla. Encyclopedia of Life.
