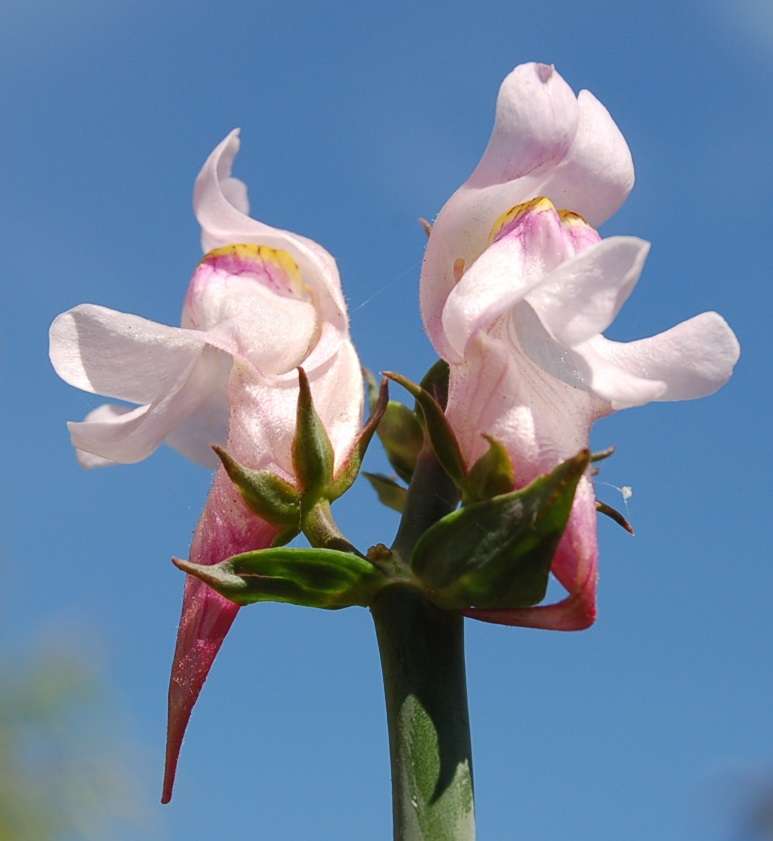

Scientific classification
- Kingdom: Plantae
- Clade: Tracheophytes
- Clade: Angiosperms
- Clade: Eudicots
- Clade: Asterids
- Order: Lamiales
- Family: Plantaginaceae
- Genus: Linaria
- Species: L. triornithophora

Binomial name
- Linaria triornithophora (L.) Cav.

= Linaria triornithophora =

Species of flowering plant

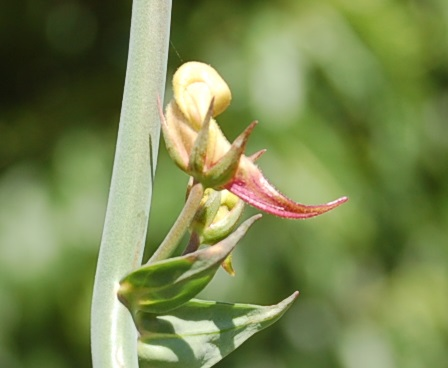
Young Linaria triornithophora flower, August 2014, U.K.

Linaria triornithophora, commonly known as three bird toadflax, is a perennial plant in the family Plantaginaceae.
