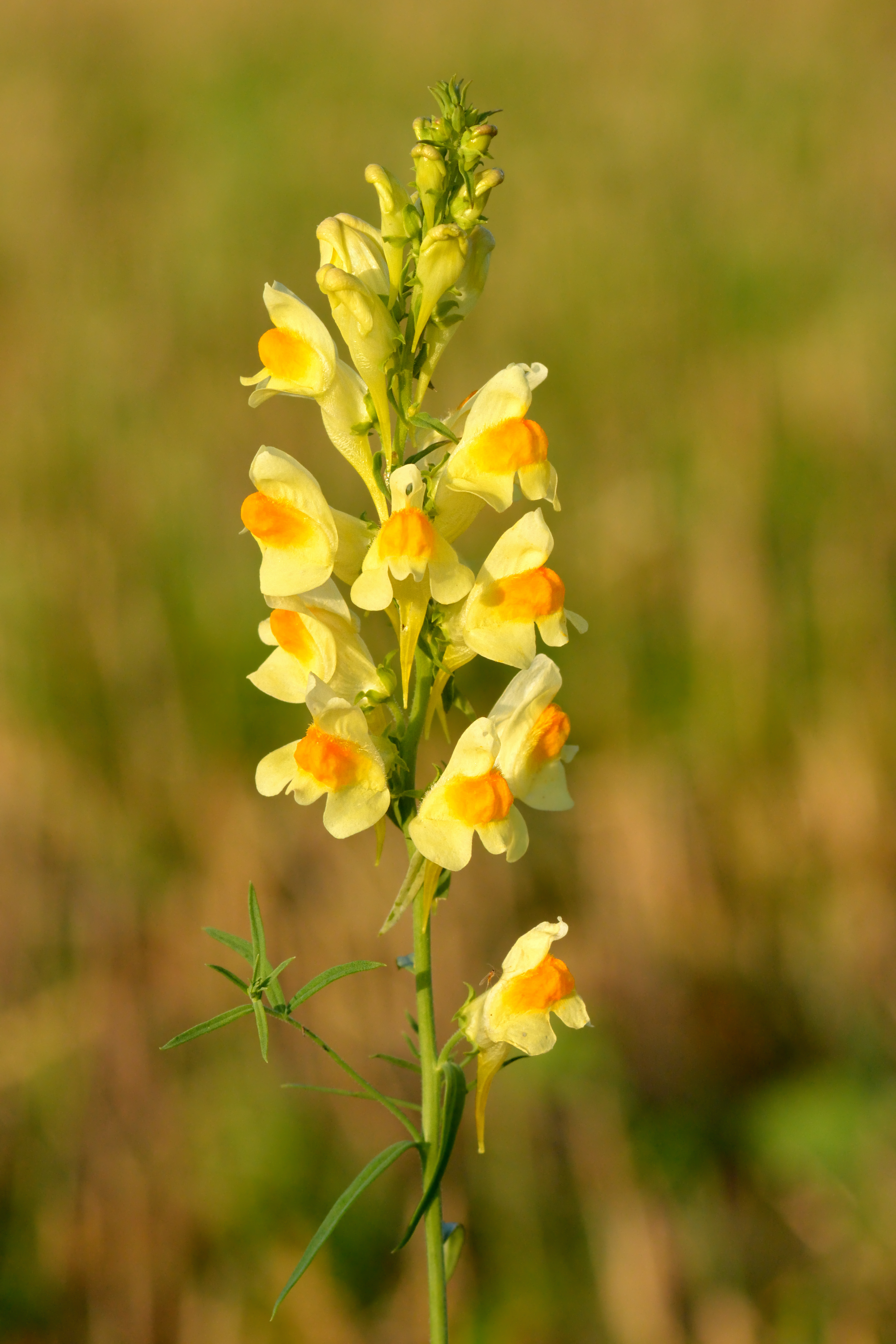
- Common toadflax (Linaria vulgaris)

Scientific classification
- Kingdom: Plantae
- Clade: Embryophytes
- Clade: Tracheophytes
- Clade: Angiosperms
- Clade: Eudicots
- Clade: Asterids
- Order: Lamiales
- Family: Plantaginaceae
- Tribe: Antirrhineae
- Genus: Linaria; Mill.

Type species
- Linaria vulgaris Mill.

Species
- See text

Synonyms
- Elatine Hill; Peloria Adans.; Saccularia Kellogg; Trimerocalyx (Murb.) Murb.

= Linaria =

Genus of flowering plants

Linaria is a genus of almost 200 species of flowering plants, one of several related groups commonly called toadflax. They are annuals and herbaceous perennials, and the largest genus in the Antirrhineae tribe of the plantain family Plantaginaceae.

== Taxonomy ==
Linaria was traditionally placed in the family Scrophulariaceae. Phylogenetic analysis has now placed it in the vastly expanded family Plantaginaceae.

Closely related genera include Nuttallanthus (American toadflaxes, recently split from Linaria), Antirrhinum (snapdragons) and Cymbalaria (ivy-leaved toadflaxes).

== Cultivation ==
Several Linaria species are cultivated as garden plants, and some are regarded as having a weedy habit.

- Common toadflax (Linaria vulgaris), a European species which is widely introduced elsewhere and grows as a common weed in some areas.
- Balkan toadflax or Dalmatian toadflax (Linaria dalmatica, syn. L. genistifolia subsp. dalmatica), a native of southeast Europe that has become a weed in parts of North America.
- Purple toadflax (Linaria purpurea), a species native to the Mediterranean region grown as a garden plant for its dark purple or pink flowers. The version with purple flowers can be mistaken for lavender. Spreads readily.
- Pale toadflax (Linaria repens), a species from western Europe similar to L. purpurea, but with paler flowers.
- Alpine toadflax (Linaria alpina), purple flowers with orange (or purple) lobes in the center.
- Annual toadflax or Moroccan toadflax (Linaria maroccana), the flower has five lobes arranged into two lips with a spur at the end, often purple with white.

== Species ==
The following species are recognised in the genus Linaria:

- Linaria accitensis L.Sáez, Juan, M.B.Crespo, F.B.Navarro, J.Peñas & Roquet
- Linaria acutiloba Fisch.
- Linaria aeruginea (Gouan) Cav.
- Linaria afghanica Podlech & Iranshahr
- Linaria alaica Junussov
- Linaria albifrons (Sm.) Spreng.
- Linaria algarviana Chav.
- Linaria almadensis Farminhão
- Linaria alpina (L.) Mill.
- Linaria altaica Fisch.
- Linaria amethystea (Vent.) Hoffmanns. & Link
- Linaria amoi Campo ex Amo
- Linaria angustissima (Loisel.) Borbás
- Linaria antilibanotica Rech.f.
- Linaria arcusangeli Atzei & Camarda
- Linaria arenaria DC.
- Linaria arenicola Pau & Font Quer
- Linaria argillicola Juan, Blanca, Cueto, J.Fuentes & L.Sáez
- Linaria armeniaca Chav.
- Linaria arvensis (L.) Desf.
- Linaria atlantica Boiss. & Reut.
- Linaria azerbaijanensis Hamdi & Assadi
- Linaria badachschanica Junussov
- Linaria badalii Willk.
- Linaria bamianica Patzak
- Linaria becerrae Blanca, Cueto & J.Fuentes
- Linaria bessarabica Kotov
- Linaria biebersteinii Besser
- Linaria bipartita (Vent.) Willd.
- Linaria bipunctata (L.) Dum.Cours.
- Linaria bordiana Santa & Simonn.
- Linaria boushehrensis Hamdi & Assadi
- Linaria brachyphylla Delip.
- Linaria bubanii Font Quer
- Linaria bungei Kuprian.
- Linaria buriatica Turcz. ex Ledeb.
- Linaria caesia (Lag. ex Pers.) F.Dietr.
- Linaria capraria Moris & De Not.
- Linaria cavanillesii Chav.
- Linaria chalepensis (L.) Mill.
- Linaria clementei Haens. ex Boiss.
- Linaria confertiflora Benth.
- Linaria corifolia Desf.
- Linaria × cornubiensis Druce
- Linaria cossoniana Braun-Blanq. & Maire
- Linaria cossonii Bonnet & Barratte
- Linaria cretacea Fisch. ex Spreng.
- Linaria dalmatica (L.) Mill.
- Linaria damascena Boiss. & Gaill.
- Linaria decipiens Batt.
- Linaria depauperata Leresche ex Lange
- Linaria diffusa Hoffmanns. & Link
- Linaria dissita Pomel
- Linaria × dominii Druce
- Linaria dumanii A.Duran & Menemen
- Linaria elegans Cav.
- Linaria elymaitica (Boiss.) Kuprian.
- Linaria fallax Coss. ex Batt.
- Linaria farsensis Hamdi & Assadi
- Linaria fastigiata Chav.
- Linaria faucicola Leresche & Levier
- Linaria fedorovii Kamelin
- Linaria ficalhoana Rouy
- Linaria flava (Poir.) Desf.
- Linaria genistifolia (L.) Mill.
- Linaria gharbensis Batt. & Pit.
- Linaria glacialis Boiss.
- Linaria glauca (L.) Cav.
- Linaria golestanensis Hamdi & Assadi
- Linaria grandiflora Desf.
- Linaria griffithii Benth.
- Linaria grjunerae Knjaz.
- Linaria guilanensis Hamdi & Assadi
- Linaria haelava (Forssk.) Delile
- Linaria hepatica Bunge
- Linaria heratensis Podlech & Iranshahr
- Linaria hirta (L.) Moench
- Linaria hohenackeri Tzvelev
- Linaria huteri Lange
- Linaria × hybrida Schur
- Linaria iconia Boiss. & Heldr.
- Linaria ikonnikovii Stasiak
- Linaria imzica Gómiz
- Linaria incarnata (Vent.) Spreng.
- Linaria incompleta Kuprian.
- Linaria intricata Coincy
- Linaria iranica Hamdi & Assadi
- Linaria × jalancina Gómez Nav., R.Roselló, A.Guillén, P.P.Ferrer, E.Laguna & Per
- Linaria japonica Miq.
- Linaria jaxartica Levichev
- Linaria joppensis Bornm.
- Linaria kavirensis Hamdi & Assadi
- Linaria khalkhalensis Hamdi & Assadi
- Linaria khorasanensis Hamdi & Assadi
- Linaria × kocianovichii Asch.
- Linaria kokanica Regel
- Linaria kulabensis B.Fedtsch.
- Linaria kurdica Boiss. & Hohen.
- Linaria latifolia Desf.
- Linaria laxiflora Desf.
- Linaria leptoceras Kuprian.
- Linaria lineolata Boiss.
- Linaria loeselii Schweigg.
- Linaria longicalcarata D.Y.Hong
- Linaria macrophylla Kuprian.
- Linaria macroura (M.Bieb.) M.Bieb.
- Linaria maroccana Hook.f.
- Linaria maymanica Wendelbo
- Linaria mazandaranensis Hamdi & Assadi
- Linaria melampyroides Kuprian.
- Linaria melanogramma Rech.f., Aellen & Esfand.
- Linaria meyeri Kuprian.
- Linaria michauxii Chav.
- Linaria micrantha (Cav.) Hoffmanns. & Link
- Linaria microsepala A.Kern.
- Linaria multicaulis (L.) Mill.
- Linaria munbyana Boiss. & Reut.
- Linaria musilii Velen.
- Linaria nachitschevanica Tzvelev
- Linaria nigricans Lange
- Linaria nivea Boiss. & Reut.
- Linaria nurensis Boiss. & Hausskn.
- Linaria nuristanica Patzak
- Linaria oblongifolia (Boiss.) Boiss. & Reut.
- Linaria odora (M.Bieb.) Fisch.
- Linaria oligantha Lange
- Linaria × oligotricha Borbás
- Linaria onubensis Pau
- Linaria orbensis Carretero & Boira
- Linaria ordubadica Tzvelev
- Linaria pamirica (Junussov) Stasiak
- Linaria paradoxa Murb.
- Linaria parviracemosa D.A.Sutton
- Linaria pedicellata Kuprian.
- Linaria pedunculata (L.) Chaz.
- Linaria pelisseriana (L.) Mill.
- Linaria peloponnesiaca Boiss. & Heldr.
- Linaria peltieri Batt.
- Linaria pinifolia (Poir.) Thell.
- Linaria platycalyx Boiss.
- Linaria polygalifolia Hoffmanns. & Link
- Linaria popovii Kuprian.
- Linaria propinqua Boiss. & Reut.
- Linaria pseudolaxiflora Lojac.
- Linaria pseudoviscosa Murb.
- Linaria purpurea (L.) Mill.
- Linaria pyramidalis (Vent.) F.Dietr.
- Linaria qartobensis Blanca, Cueto, J.Fuentes, L.Sáez & Tarifa
- Linaria quasisessilis Levichev
- Linaria reflexa (L.) Desf.
- Linaria remotiflora Patzak
- Linaria repens (L.) Mill.
- Linaria ricardoi Cout.
- Linaria riffea Pau
- Linaria × rocheri P.Fourn.
- Linaria rubioides Vis. & Pancic
- Linaria sabulosa Czern. ex Klokov
- Linaria salangensis Podlech & Iranshahr
- Linaria salzmannii Boiss.
- Linaria sagrensis Blanca, Cueto, J. Fuentes, L. Gutiérrez & F.B. Navarro
- Linaria saposhnikovii Nikitina
- Linaria saturejoides Boiss.
- Linaria saxatilis (L.) Chaz.
- Linaria schelkownikowii Schischk.
- Linaria schirvanica Fomin
- Linaria semialata D.López, Sánchez-Gómez, J.F.Jiménez, J.B.Vera & Güemes
- Linaria × sepium G.J.Allman
- Linaria sessilis Kuprian.
- Linaria simplex Desf.
- Linaria spartea (L.) Chaz.
- Linaria striatella Kuprian.
- Linaria supina (L.) Chaz.
- Linaria tarhunensis Pamp.
- Linaria tenuis (Viv.) Spreng.
- Linaria thibetica Franch.
- Linaria thymifolia (Vahl) DC.
- Linaria tingitana Boiss. & Reut.
- Linaria tonzigii Lona
- Linaria triornithophora (L.) Cav.
- Linaria triphylla (L.) Mill.
- Linaria tristis (L.) Mill.
- Linaria tursica Valdés & Cabezudo
- Linaria unaiensis Patzak
- Linaria × valdesiana Socorro & Aroza
- Linaria venosa Lindl.
- Linaria ventricosa Coss. & Balansa
- Linaria veratrifolia Patzak
- Linaria verticillata Boiss.
- Linaria virgata (Poir.) Desf.
- Linaria viscosa (L.) Dum.Cours.
- Linaria volgensis Rakov & Tzvelev
- Linaria vulgaris Mill.
- Linaria warionis Pomel
- Linaria weilleri Emb. & Maire
- Linaria yunnanensis W.W.Sm.
- Linaria yusufeliensis A.Galán, Makbul & Hamzaoglu
- Linaria × zaborskiana Emb.
- Linaria zaissanica Semiotr.

== Etymology ==
The members of this genus are known in English as toadflax, a name shared with several related genera. The 'toad' in toadflax may relate to the plants having historically been used to treat bubonic plague, a false link having been drawn between the words 'bubo' and 'Bufo'. The scientific name Linaria means "resembling linum" (flax), which the foliage of some species superficially resembles.

== Distribution and habitat ==
The genus is native to temperate regions of Europe, northern Africa and Asia, with the highest species diversity in the Mediterranean region.

== Ecology ==
Some Linaria are regarded as noxious weeds. They are likely toxic to livestock, but ruminants generally avoid them.

== Chemical composition ==
Linaria species are rich in alkaloids, iridoids, terpenes, phenolic acids and flavonoids.

Vasicine, vasicinone, 7-hyrdoxyvasicine, linarinic acid, choline, linavuline, luteolin, acacetin, apigenin, chrysin, quercetin, myricetin, linarioside, aucubin, linaride, iridolinaroside A-D, and iridolinarin A-C are some compounds found in plants of this genus.

== Uses ==
Toadflaxes are used as food plants by the larvae of some Lepidoptera species, including the mouse moth (Amphipyra tragopoginis) and the common buckeye (Junonia coenia).

=== Traditional medicine ===
Linaria vulgaris has been used as a medicinal herb.

== Bibliography ==
- A Phylogeny of Toadflaxes (Linaria Mill.) Based on Nuclear Internal Transcribed Spacer Sequences: Systematic and Evolutionary Consequences. Mario Fernández-Mazuecos, José Luis Blanco-Pastor, and Pablo Vargas. International Journal of Plant Sciences, Vol. 174, No. 2 (February 2013), pp. 234–249 Published by: The University of Chicago Press, Article DOI: 10.1086/668790
- Vargas P, JA Rosselló, R Oyama, J Güemes. 2004 Molecular evidence for naturalness of genera in the tribe Antirrhineae (Scrophulariaceae) and three independent evolutionary lineages from the New World and the Old. Plant Systematics and Evolution 249:151–172.
