= Toadflax =

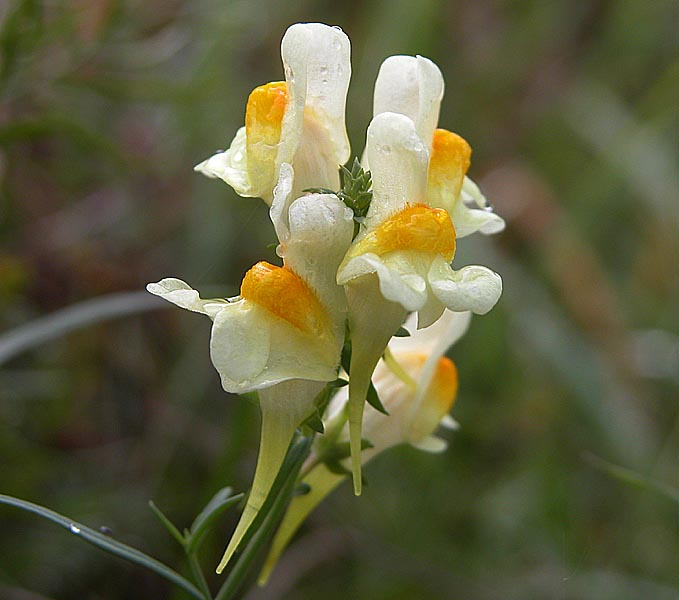

Toadflax is the common name of several related genera of plants in the family Plantaginaceae, including:

- Anarrhinum
- Antirrhinum, also called snapdragon
- Chaenorhinum, native to Turkey and the Mediterranean
- Cymbalaria
- Linaria
- Misopates
- Nuttallanthus
