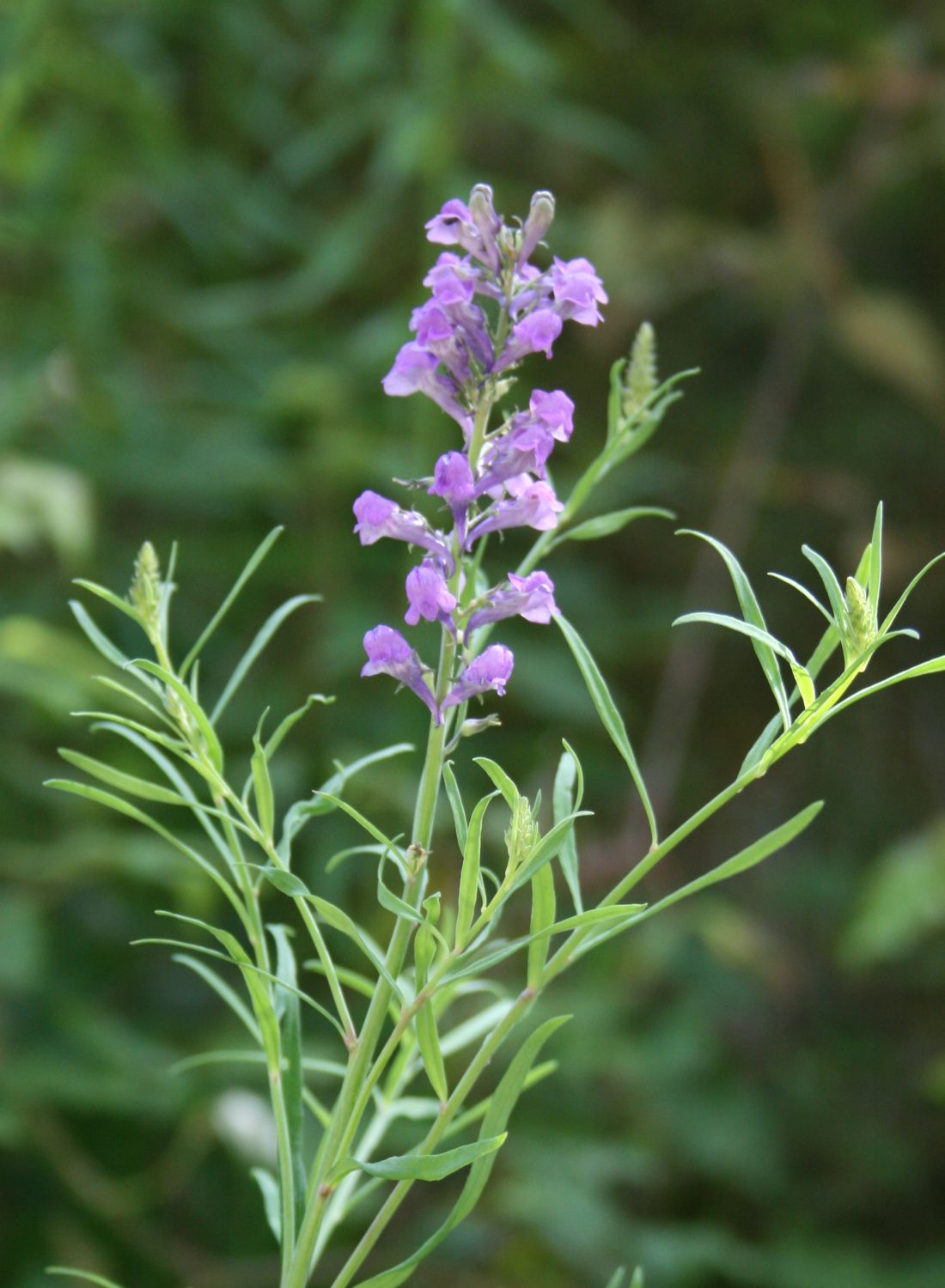
- Linaria purpurea in Aspromonte, southern Italy

Scientific classification
- Kingdom: Plantae
- Clade: Embryophytes
- Clade: Tracheophytes
- Clade: Spermatophytes
- Clade: Angiosperms
- Clade: Eudicots
- Clade: Asterids
- Order: Lamiales
- Family: Plantaginaceae
- Genus: Linaria
- Species: L. purpurea

Binomial name
- Linaria purpurea (L.) Mill.

Synonyms
- Antirrhinum purpureum L.; Termontis purpurea (L.) Raf.; Linaria purpurascens Bernh. ex Hornem.

= Linaria purpurea =

Species of flowering plant

Linaria purpurea or purple toadflax is a purple-flowered plant in the plantain family Plantaginaceae, endemic to central and southern regions of Italy including Sicily.

It is widely planted in gardens and is also naturalised in several other temperate regions globally.

== Description ==
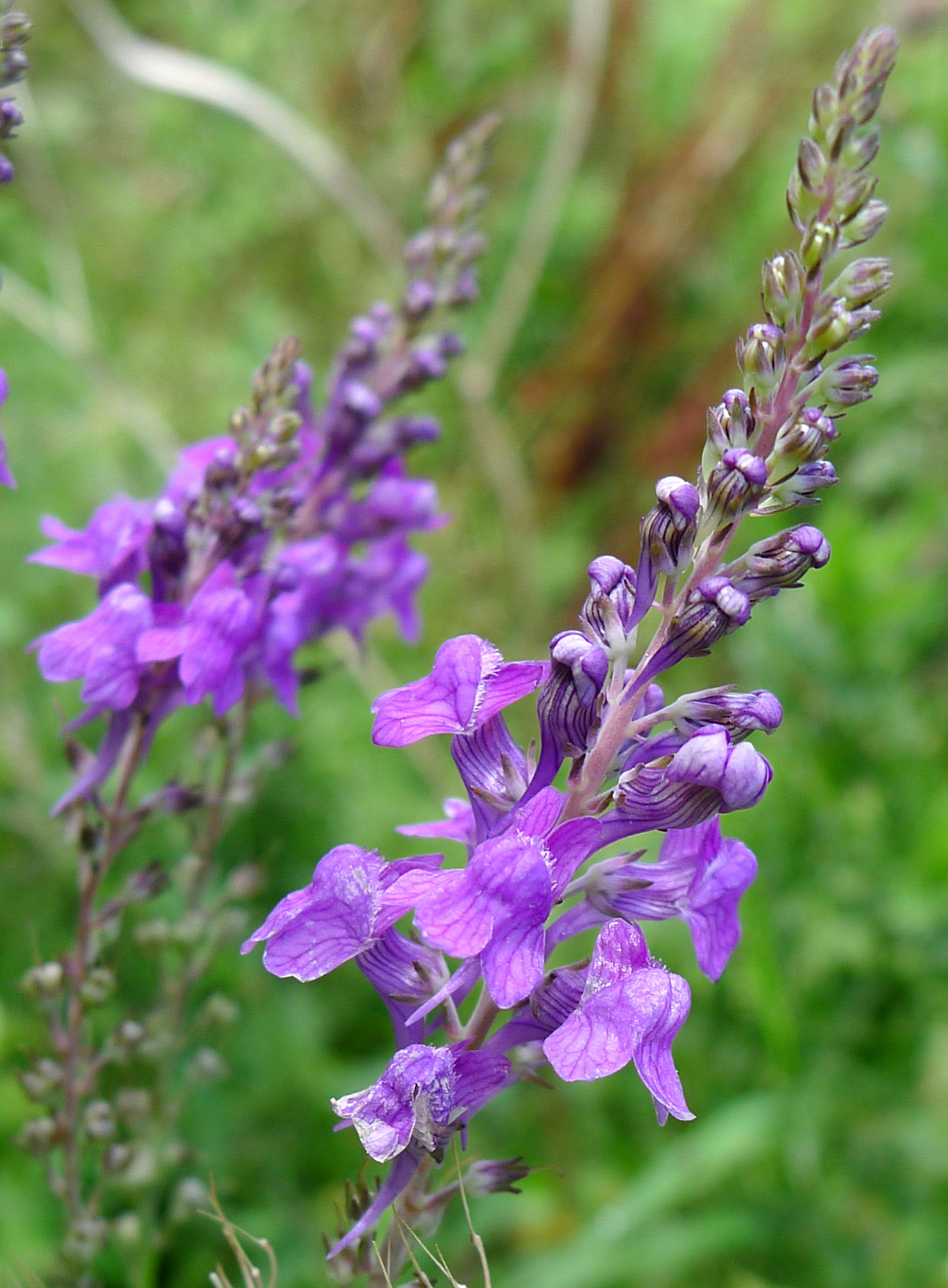
Flowers

It is a perennial herbaceous plant growing 1 metre (3 ft 3 in) tall (rarely to 1.2 m) with erect stems bearing glabrous, glaucous grey-green linear leaves 2–4.5 cm long and 2–3 mm broad. The inflorescence is a raceme of flowers occupying the top of the stem. The flower is between 8–13 mm long with five lobes arranged into two lips with a 3–6 mm spur at the end. The flower is usually dark purple or violet, rarely pale or even white. The flowering season is long, from April to October. The fruit is a capsule. Plants at high altitude have broader leaves, up to 10 mm wide; these have been described as L. purpurea var. montana Caruel, but as the variation is continuous, this is not accepted as a valid taxon.

== Range ==
It is endemic to central and southern Italy, in Abruzzo, Basilicata, Calabria, Campania, Emilia-Romagna, Lazio, Marche, Molise, Puglia, Sicily, Toscana, and Umbria. It occurs naturally in cliffs, scree, woodland edges, and on uncultivated land. It has a wide environmental range, growing from sea level up to 1,900 m, and up to 2,500 m on Gran Sasso d'Italia.

=== Non-native range ===
It is naturalised in Europe north of its native range in Italy in Veneto, and in Germany, Great Britain, and Ireland, in western North America from California north to British Columbia, in South America in Argentina, and in New Zealand. It is widely cultivated as an ornamental plant.

In Britain it is sometimes regarded as a weed, spreading readily on stony waste ground and walls, although it is tolerated for its attractive, long-lasting flowers which are very attractive to bees.

There is a pale pink cultivar named 'Canon Went'.

== Cultural value ==
Because of its wide range in Italy and status as an Italian endemic species, combined with its beauty, it has been suggested as a floral emblem for the country.

== Toxicity and chemistry ==
This plant is poisonous to livestock, though ruminants may tend to avoid consuming it. The larvae of some species of Lepidoptera (butterflies) use this plant as a food source. In a recent study conducted in Italy the plant was found to contain a compound exhibiting antifungal activity, which drastically reduced the production of aflatoxin B1 in Aspergillus flavus Link., making it a potential natural and 'green' anti-aflatoxin B1 agent suitable for use in the food industry.
