= Linaria tristis =

Scientific classification
- Kingdom: Plantae
- Clade: Tracheophytes
- Clade: Angiosperms
- Clade: Eudicots
- Clade: Asterids
- Order: Lamiales
- Family: Plantaginaceae
- Genus: Linaria
- Species: L. tristis

Binomial name
- Linaria tristis (L.) Mill.

Synonyms
- Antirrhinum triste L., Sp. Pl.: 613. 1753; Linaria glaucophylla (Brot.) Hoffmanns. & Link; Linaria marginata Desf.; Linaria tristis subsp. eu-tristis Maire, nom. inval.

Species of flowering plant

Linaria tristis, the melancholy toadflax, is a species of annual flowering plant in the family Plantaginaceae, native to the western Mediterranean region and centered in the Iberian Peninsula. It inhabits open, dry environments on sandy or rocky substrates and is characteristic of disturbed ground in Mediterranean climates.

== Taxonomy ==
The species was first described by Carl Linnaeus in 1753 as Antirrhinum triste L. in Species Plantarum. It was transferred to the genus Linaria by Philip Miller in the eighth edition of The Gardeners Dictionary.

Linaria tristis is placed in Linaria sect. Linaria, a group characterised by spurred, bilabiate corollas and capsular fruits with discoid, winged seeds. The accepted name and synonymy are consistent across modern taxonomic treatments.

== Description ==
Linaria tristis is an annual herb, glabrous to sparsely pubescent, 10–40(–50) cm tall. Stems erect to ascending, slender, usually branched from the base. Leaves alternate, linear to narrowly linear-lanceolate, (10–)15–35 mm long and 0.5–2 mm wide, entire, sessile, with a single prominent midrib.

Inflorescence a lax raceme, sometimes reduced to solitary axillary flowers. Pedicels slender, erect to spreading. Calyx deeply 5-partite; lobes linear to narrowly lanceolate, subequal, 3–6 mm long. Corolla zygomorphic, bilabiate, pale yellow to yellowish-white, sometimes tinged with faint violet or brownish veins on the palate; upper lip 2-lobed, lower lip 3-lobed. Spur slender, straight to slightly curved, equalling or exceeding the remainder of the corolla tube. Stamens four, didynamous; style slender, stigma capitate.

Fruit a globose to subglobose capsule, dehiscing by apical pores. Seeds numerous, discoid, broadly winged, brown to dark brown, adapted for wind dispersal. Flowering occurs mainly from March to June, depending on latitude and seasonal rainfall.

== Distribution and habitat ==
Within a regional Iberian context, Linaria tristis is distributed across central and southern Spain and parts of Portugal. Peripheral records from northwestern Africa have been reported, but these are sometimes regarded as marginal or uncertain in regional floras.

The species grows in open, dry habitats including sandy fields, fallow land, rocky slopes, road verges, and other disturbed sites, from sea level to approximately 1,200 metres (3,900 ft) elevation. It favours well-drained, often nutrient-poor soils and full sun.

== Ecology ==
Linaria tristis is pollinated primarily by bees capable of accessing nectar within the floral spur, a pollination syndrome typical of the genus. As a winter or early-spring annual, it completes its life cycle rapidly before the onset of summer drought, persisting between seasons as a soil seed bank.

== Taxonomic notes and similar species ==
Most Iberian floras, including Flora Iberica, treat Linaria tristis as a morphologically variable species without formally recognised infraspecific taxa. In this treatment, it is placed in Linaria sect. Linaria and distinguished from similar species such as Linaria simplex and Linaria spartea by its very narrow linear leaves, pale yellow corolla lacking a strongly contrasting palate, and a long, slender spur equalling or exceeding the length of the corolla tube. The discoid, broadly winged seeds further separate it from species with tuberculate or narrowly winged seeds.

Other authors, primarily in North African floristic treatments, have recognised several subspecies within a broader Linaria tristis complex and have placed the species in Linaria sect. Supinae. These infraspecific taxa are not universally accepted and are largely geographically defined. Subspecies reported in the literature include:

- Linaria tristis subsp. lurida (Ball) Maire
- Linaria tristis subsp. marginata (Desf.) Maire
- Linaria tristis subsp. mesatlantica D.A.Sutton
- Linaria tristis subsp. pectinata (Pau & Font Quer) Maire
- Linaria tristis subsp. tristis
