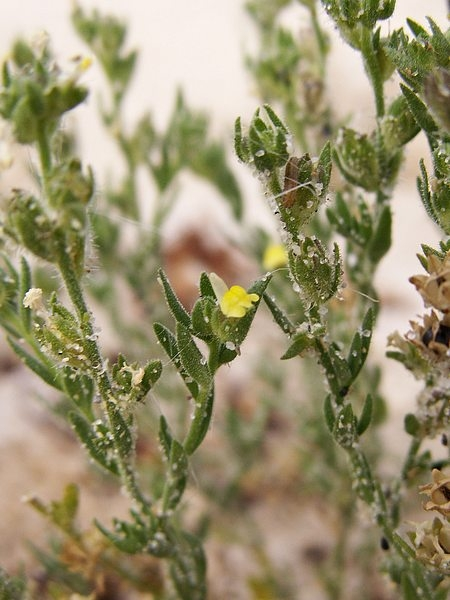

Scientific classification
- Kingdom: Plantae
- Clade: Tracheophytes
- Clade: Angiosperms
- Clade: Eudicots
- Clade: Asterids
- Order: Lamiales
- Family: Plantaginaceae
- Genus: Linaria
- Species: L. arenaria

Binomial name
- Linaria arenaria DC

Synonyms
- Antirrhinum arenarium (DC.) Poir.; Antirrhinum pubescens (Desf.) Pers; Linaria candollei Chav.; Linaria pubescens Desf. ex Chav.; Linaria arenaria var. saxatilis (DC.) Gren. & Godr.

= Linaria arenaria =

Species of flowering plant

Linaria arenaria, sometimes called sand toadflax or French toadflax, is a yellow-flowered member of the genus Linaria. It is found in sand-dunes and sandy grassland in western France, north-west Spain and Portugal and is thus a psammophyte plant . It is found casually in England and reliably at two sites. One is Braunton Burrows in north Devon where it was planted around 1893 and continues to grow, and the other, since 2004, is in north Somerset.

== Description ==
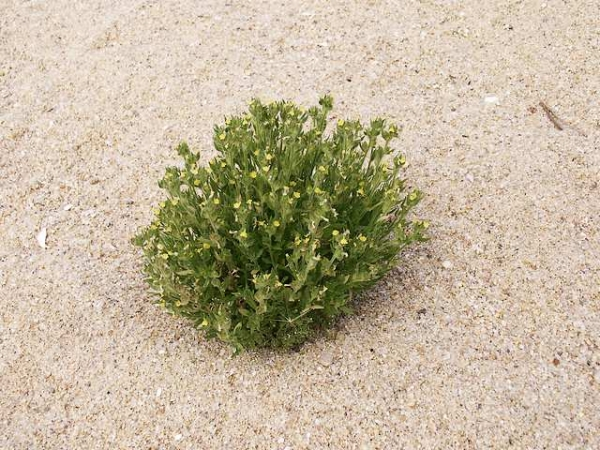
Linaria arenaria growing at Trinité-sur-Mer, 2009

It is an annual plant and grows to around 15 cm (5.9 in). The leaves and stem are covered in sticky hairs. The flowers open in June–July. They are in a cluster at the top of the stem and are yellow with a purplish spur.

The species was first described by Augustin Pyramus de Candolle in 1808.
