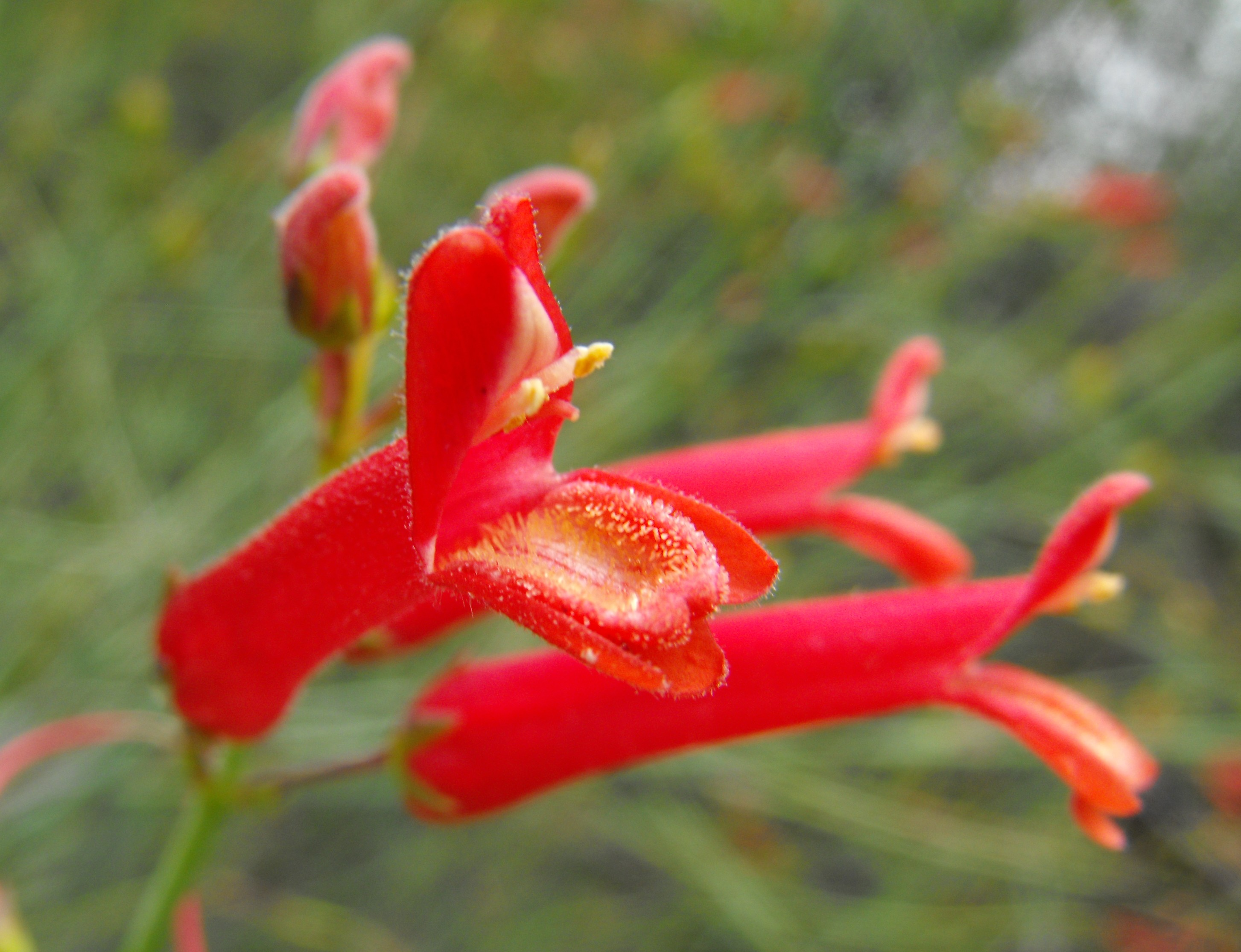

Scientific classification
- Kingdom: Plantae
- Clade: Tracheophytes
- Clade: Angiosperms
- Clade: Eudicots
- Clade: Asterids
- Order: Lamiales
- Family: Plantaginaceae
- Genus: Gambelia
- Species: G. juncea

Binomial name
- Gambelia juncea (Benth.) D.A.Sutton

Synonyms
- Synonymy: Maurandya juncea Benth. 1844 (Basionym); Saccularia veatchii Kellogg 1860; Antirrhinum junceum (Benth.) A.Gray 1867; Galvezia juncea (Benth.) Ball 1886; Galvezia glabrata Brandegee 1903; Galvezia speciosum var. pubescens Brandegee 1903; Galvezia rupicola Brandegee 1916; Galvezia juncea var. foliosa I.M.Johnst. 1924; Galvezia juncea var. pubescens (Brandegee) I.M.Johnst. 1924; Galvezia juncea var. typica Munz 1926; Saccularia juncea (Benth.) Rothm. 1943; Saccularia glabrata (Brandegee) Rothm. 1943; Saccularia rupicola (Brandegee) Rothm. 1943; Gambelia glabrata (Brandegee) D.A.Sutton 1988; Gambelia rupicola (Brandegee) D.A.Sutton 1988

= Gambelia juncea =

Baja California bush snapdragon

Species of plant

Gambelia juncea is a species of flowering shrub in the plantain family commonly known as the Baja California bush snapdragon or Baja bush snapdragon. Gambelia juncea is a highly variable woody perennial to 1 m (3.3 ft) characterized by long, arching, reed-like stems and showy, bright red, two-lipped tubular flowers. Native to the Baja California peninsula and coastal Sonora, this species is widespread in the region across numerous habitats and has several varieties. It was formerly placed in the primarily South American genus Galvezia, but taxonomic studies have supported the reclassification of the two North American species (the other is Gambelia speciosa) into Gambelia. This species, with a number of cultivars, is widely used as an ornamental shrub for xeriscaping, erosion control, native plant gardens, and wildlife gardens.

== Description ==
=== Characteristics ===
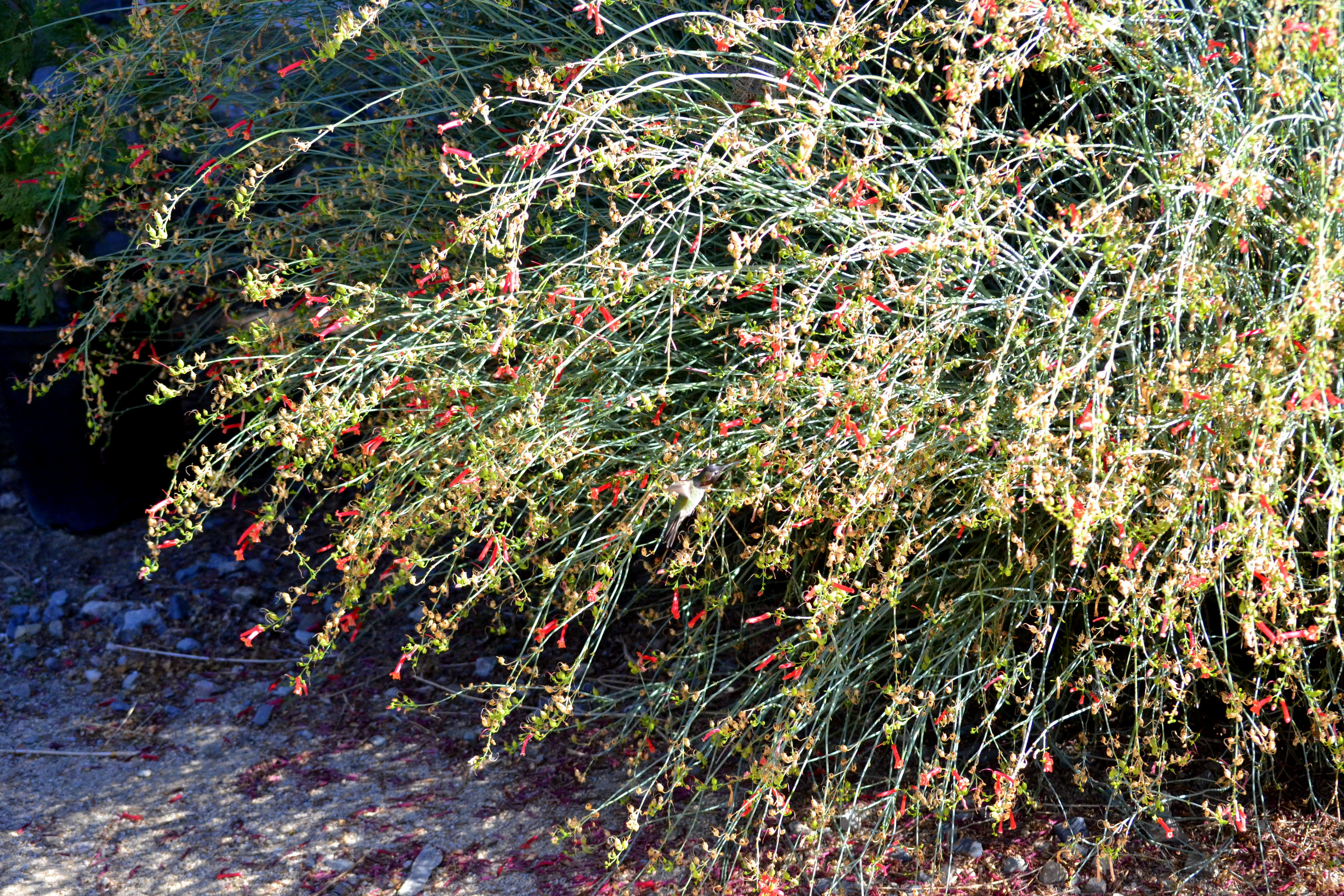
The arch-like habit of the stems, in cultivated plants.

Gambelia juncea is a highly variable woody perennial to 1 m (3.3 ft) tall. The stems and branches may be reed-like or tortile and clambering, some plants with small, thin leaves and minimal foliage, others more foliose and with wide, large leaves. The herbage may be glaucous, covered in glandular hairs, or smooth and completely absent of hair. The showy flower is long, bright red, and tubular, with two lips. The other species in the genus, Gambelia speciosa, can be readily distinguished from G. juncea due to its unique flower tube, which has the throat of the tubular flower closed by a projection of the base of the lower lip.

=== Morphology ===
Gambelia juncea is an erect or spreading shrub with many slender stems that are much-branched and 6–15 dm (24–59 in) high. The nodes are 2–8 cm (0.79–3.15 in) long, the internodes longer than adjacent leaves. The leaves are arranged oppositely or in whorls of three, varying in size and pubescence. The leaves are shaped elliptic to nearly linear, with the leaf veins converging towards the tip, the leaf blade usually 5 mm (0.20 in) or less in width.

The inflorescences are subracemose or axillary, with two to three flowers borne on the upper parts of branches. The pedicels are 1–3 cm (0.39–1.18 in) long. The calyx is campanulate and divided into five segments, which are subequal and shaped lance-ovate to oblong-ovate. The calyx segments measure 2.5–5 mm (0.098–0.197 in) long in flower to 5–7 mm (0.20–0.28 in) in fruit.

The bilabiate corolla is tubular, 2.5–3 cm (0.98–1.18 in) long, and faintly saccate at the base. The upper lip is erect and obscurely 2-lobed, while the lower lip is reflexed and 3-lobed. The corolla is a bright red. There are 4 fertile stamens, which vary in their length, often exceeding, equal to, or shorter than the corolla, sometimes didynamous. The ovary is ovoid and oblique at the base. The fruit is an ovoid capsule, which dehisces by a rounded, irregular pore at the apex of each locule. A persistent, thread-like style remains on the fruit. The seeds are dark, about 1 mm (0.039 in) long, with thin, irregular ridges.

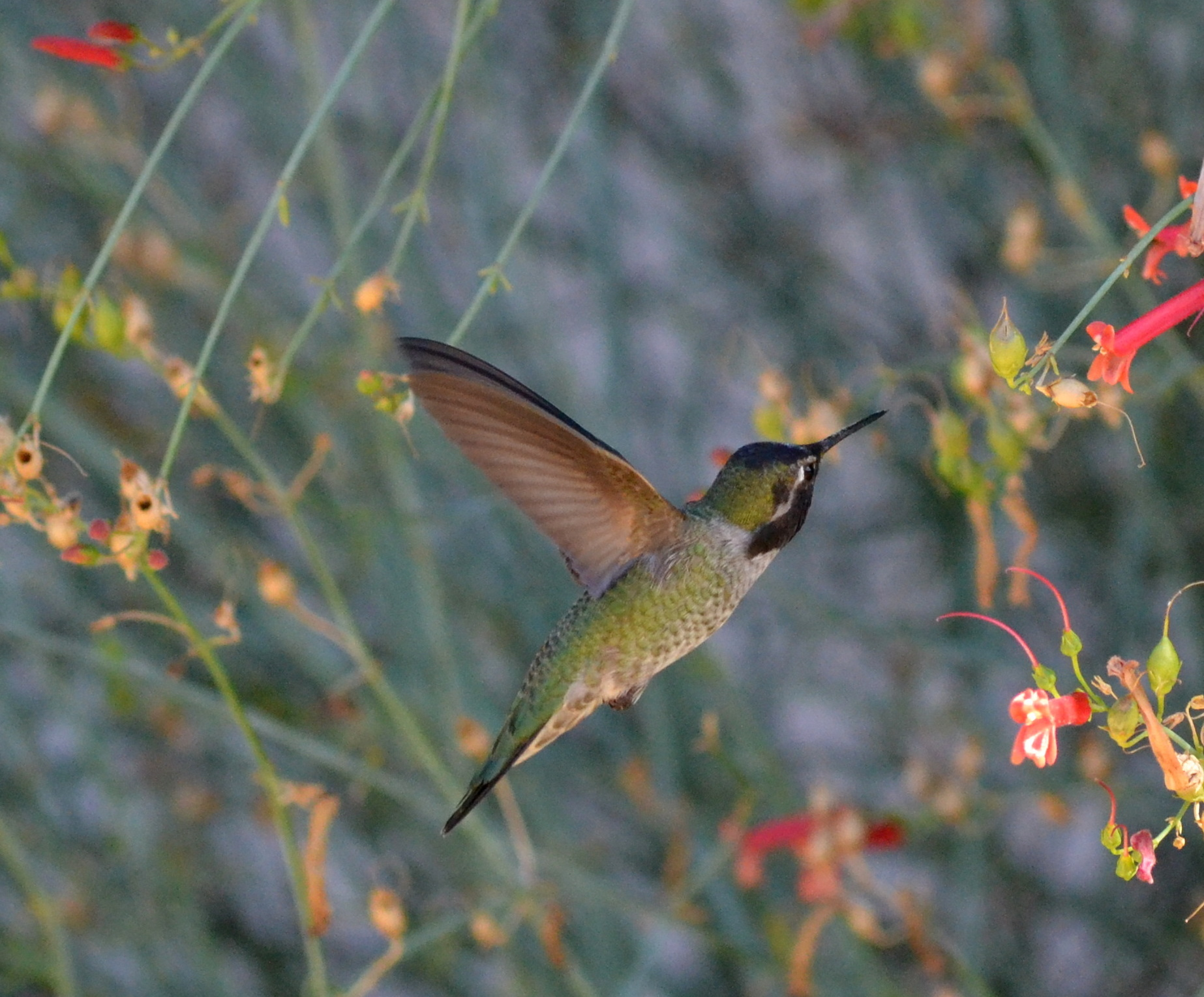
A hummingbird pollinating Gambelia juncea.

== Taxonomy ==
=== Taxonomic history ===
==== Bentham to Gray ====
This plant was first described by George Bentham in 1844 as Maurandya juncea, from a type specimen collected by Richard Brinsley Hinds (or George Barclay, under Hinds's direction) during the voyage of HMS Sulphur, which was exploring the Pacific coast of North America. The plant is described as glabrous. The locality cited is: "From San Diego to the Bay of Magdalena."

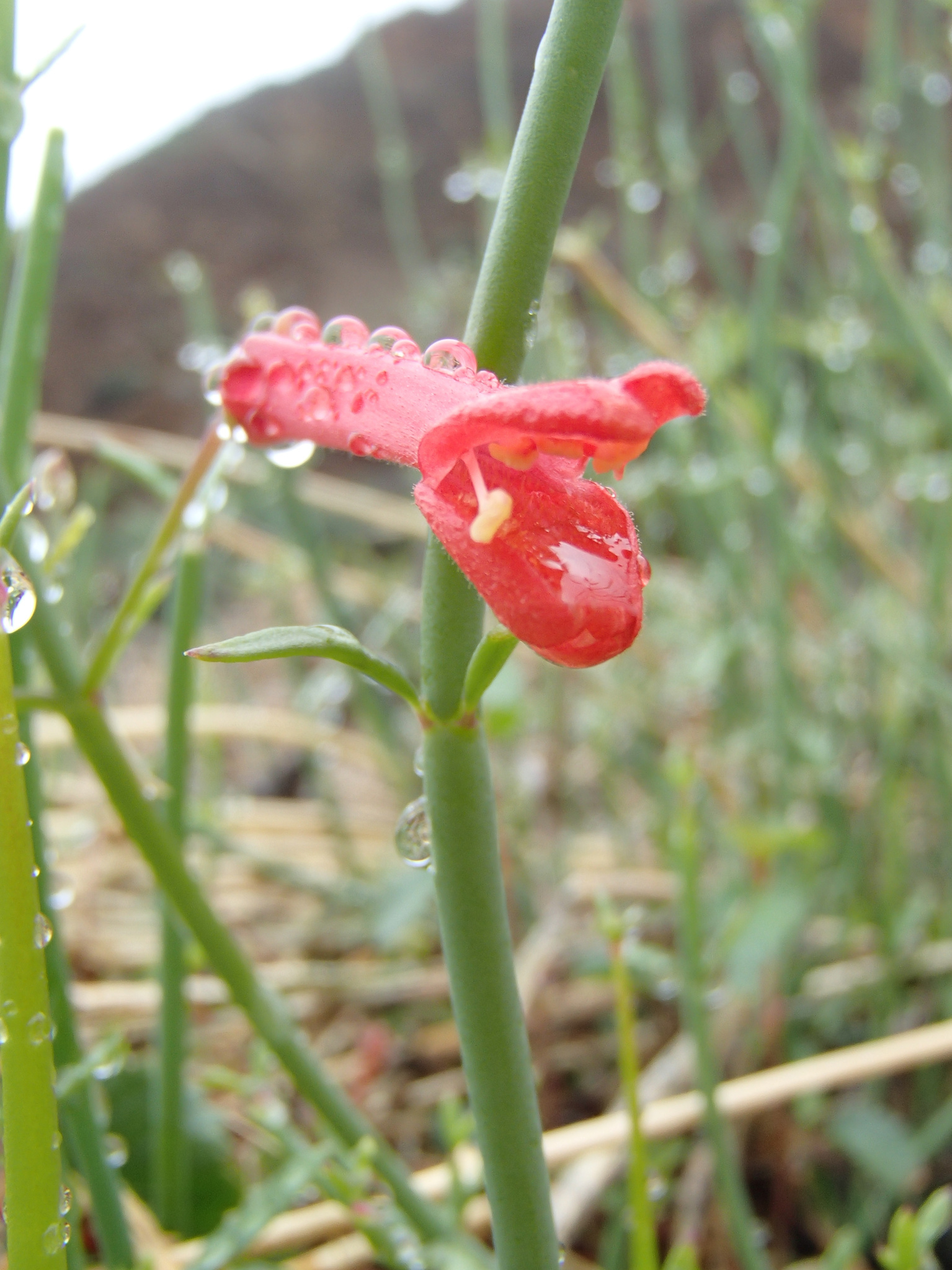
Gambelia juncea on Cedros Island.

In 1860 Albert Kellogg described the monotypic genus Saccularia veatchii based on material collected on Cedros Island by John A. Veatch. Kellogg notes the similarity of Saccularia to the Peruvian genus Galvezia of Dombey, suggesting that they are closely allied, but kept them separated based on the morphological differences between their styles and stigmas. Kellogg describes Saccularia as glandular pubescent. Because of the difference in pubescence between Kellogg's Saccularia and Bentham's M. juncea, for a few years both taxa were considered distinct.

In 1867 Asa Gray reclassified M. juncea as Antirrhinum junceum. On making the transfer, Gray noted that he did not actually see the specimens, but he thought it seemed to be a congener of Antirrhinum speciosum. In 1886, John Ball of the Linnean Society, with information from correspondence with Gray, discussed the relationship of Galvezia and Antirrhinum and reclassified A. junceum into Galvezia juncea, noting that the morphology of the corolla was more similar to Galvezia limensis because the lower lip is nearly or quite plane. Ball and Gray recognized Kellogg's Saccularia as a synonym. Gray is sometimes erroneously cited as having produced the name Galvezia juncea in 1887, as Ball's transfer was overshadowed by Gray's reporting on the new combination several months later, which did not include a mention of Ball's name.

==== Brandegee to Munz ====
In 1903 T.S. Brandegee described Galvezia glabrata from the Cape region of Baja California Sur. Brandegee's justification for separating it from G. juncea were the longer stamens, larger anthers, a pendulous fruit, and the larger and more noticeable leaves. In the same text, Brandegee also described the variety Galvezia speciosa var. pubescens from the Cape region, separated from G. juncea on the basis of its hairy flowering stems and placed with other pubescent plants from San Clemente Island.

In 1916 Brandegee described Galvezia rupicola, also from the Cape region. He distinguished it from G. juncea on the basis of a different habit, glandular hairs, and broad, persistent leaves. Brandegee collected the specimens at the rocky promontory of Cabo San Lucas and at Saucito in Baja California Sur.

In 1924 Ivan M. Johnston described and combined a new series of varieties for Galvezia juncea based on information from expeditions to the islands of the Gulf of California in 1921. Johnston described G. juncea var. foliosa from San Felipe and several Gulf islands, distinguishing it from the typical species on the basis of well-developed foliage with long leaves and glabrous stems. Brandegee's Galvezia speciosa var. pubescens was recombined into G. juncea var. pubescens, which Johnston found on Angel de la Guarda and Espiritu Santo islands. Galvezia glabrata was reduced into a synonym of Johnston's G. juncea var. foliosa. The typical form of G. juncea was reported as a glabrate plant with reduced leaves found over the western part of the peninsula.

In 1926 Philip A. Munz reviewed Galvezia juncea as part of his work on the Antirrhineae of the New World. Munz described the typical form as G. juncea var. typica, characterized by reduced or almost lacking leaves, and glaucous, broomlike stems, and inferred the type locality from the HMS Sulphur at San Quintin. Munz treated Galvezia rupicola as a synonym of G. juncea var. pubescens. He also noted that the varieties were variable and intergraded with each other, and some even had characteristics from two varieties on one plant.

==== Rothmaler to Sutton ====
In 1943, Werner Rothmaler revived Kellogg's Saccularia as a distinct genus and recognized three species, Saccularia juncea, Saccularia glabrata, and Sacculara rupicola.

In 1949, Ira L. Wiggins conducted a taxonomic review of Galvezia juncea. He concluded due to the hybridization and polymorphism of the species, the presence or absence of pubescent twigs was a worthless character to separate varieties, and instead retained two varieties distinguished on a different set of characteristics, namely fruit and leaf morphology. Wiggins's G. juncea var. typica was characterized by small leaves less than 1 cm (0.39 in) long and ovoid to oblong-shaped fruit capsules, while his var. pubescens was characterized by larger leaves 1–2.5 cm (0.39–0.98 in) long and with broadly ovoid to subglobose fruit capsules. Johnston's var. foliosa and Brandegee's G. glabrata and G. rupicola were submerged into Wiggins's var. pubescens.

By 1980, Wiggins's Flora of Baja California recognized three varieties, distinguished by leaf size and habit. Galvezia juncea var. typica was replaced with the autonym Galvezia juncea var. juncea, although still referring to the same entity with leaves less than 1 cm (0.39 in) long. Wiggins revived Johnston's var. foliosa to represent plants from ranging from Bahia de Los Angeles to Saucito with weak, clambering, and "not markedly reedlike" habits. Variety pubescens was still retained from his previous assessment, although the key in Flora of Baja California discards fruit shape.

David A. Sutton's 1988 work A revision of the tribe Antirrhineae combined the North American species of Galvezia into Gambelia, and left Galvezia as a South American genus. Sutton combined Galvezia juncea into Gambelia juncea, and also recognized two new combinations based on Brandegee's Cape species, Gambelia rupicola and Gambelia glabrata. Sutton's recognition of the two Cape taxa was subsequently challenged by a 1993 paper by Wayne J. Elisens and Allan D. Nelson, which through morphological and genetic analysis, suggested that G. rupicola and G. glabrata were not distinct from G. juncea and within the range of polymorphism for that species. The paper also did not recognize any infraspecific taxa. The two-species definition of Gambelia, without infraspecific taxa, is recognized by authorities on the flora of the Baja California peninsula, like the San Diego Natural History Museum, but four species in Gambelia are still recognized by Kew's Plants of the World Online as of 2022.

=== Subdivisions and synonymy ===
Gambelia juncea has a wide range of morphological variability. The size of the foliage, habit, and amount of hair varies across populations. This variability has been expressed by taxonomists through the creation of numerous infraspecific taxa and the segregation of certain populations as species, like Gambelia glabrata and Gambelia rupicola. Phylogenetic analyses of morphological and genetic differences across the range of G. juncea suggests that these varieties and segregate species are not well-supported, being separated primarily on minor and inconstant quantitative differences, and that the basic pattern of polymorphism within G. juncea encompasses them.

== Distribution and habitat ==
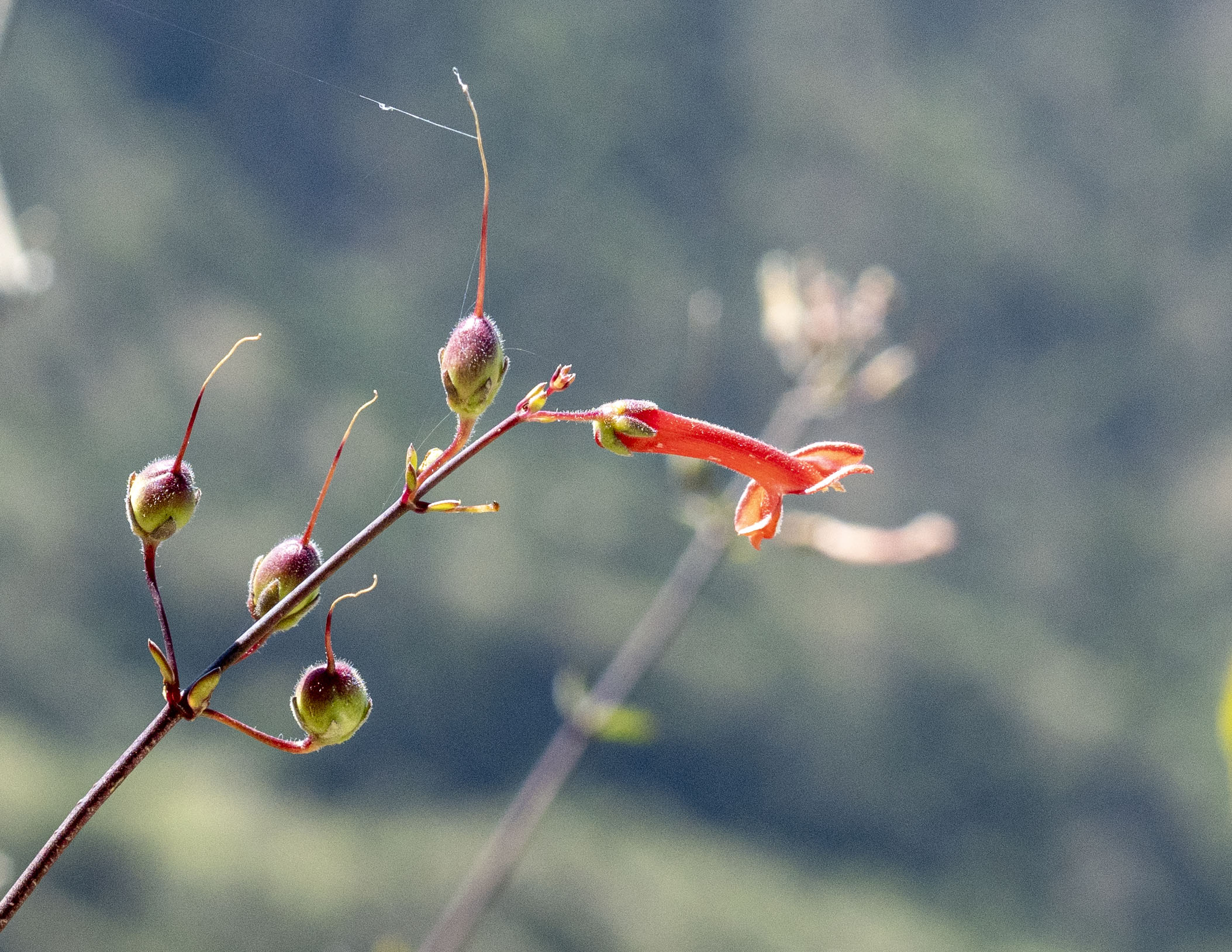
Gambelia juncea at the peak of the Sierra de la Laguna

Gambelia juncea is native to the states of Baja California, Baja California Sur, and Sonora, Mexico. Widely distributed on the Baja California peninsula, it is found from the vicinity of La Misión in northwestern Baja California south to the Cape region at the southern tip of the peninsula in Baja California Sur. It is only absent in the north-eastern part of Baja California and at higher elevations. This species is also found on various islands in the Gulf of California, rarely on the coast of Sonora, and on the Pacific coast islands of Cedros, Magdalena and Santa Margarita.

Gambelia juncea grows in a wide variety of habitats, from coastal sage scrub and chaparral in the north of its range to deserts, mountains, xeric scrublands and tropical dry forests in the south. This species can usually be found growing in a diverse range of microhabitats, including in rocky ravines, along desert washes, on hillsides, on faces of cliffs and narrow ledges, talus slopes at the base of cliffs, and in coastal areas.

== Horticulture ==
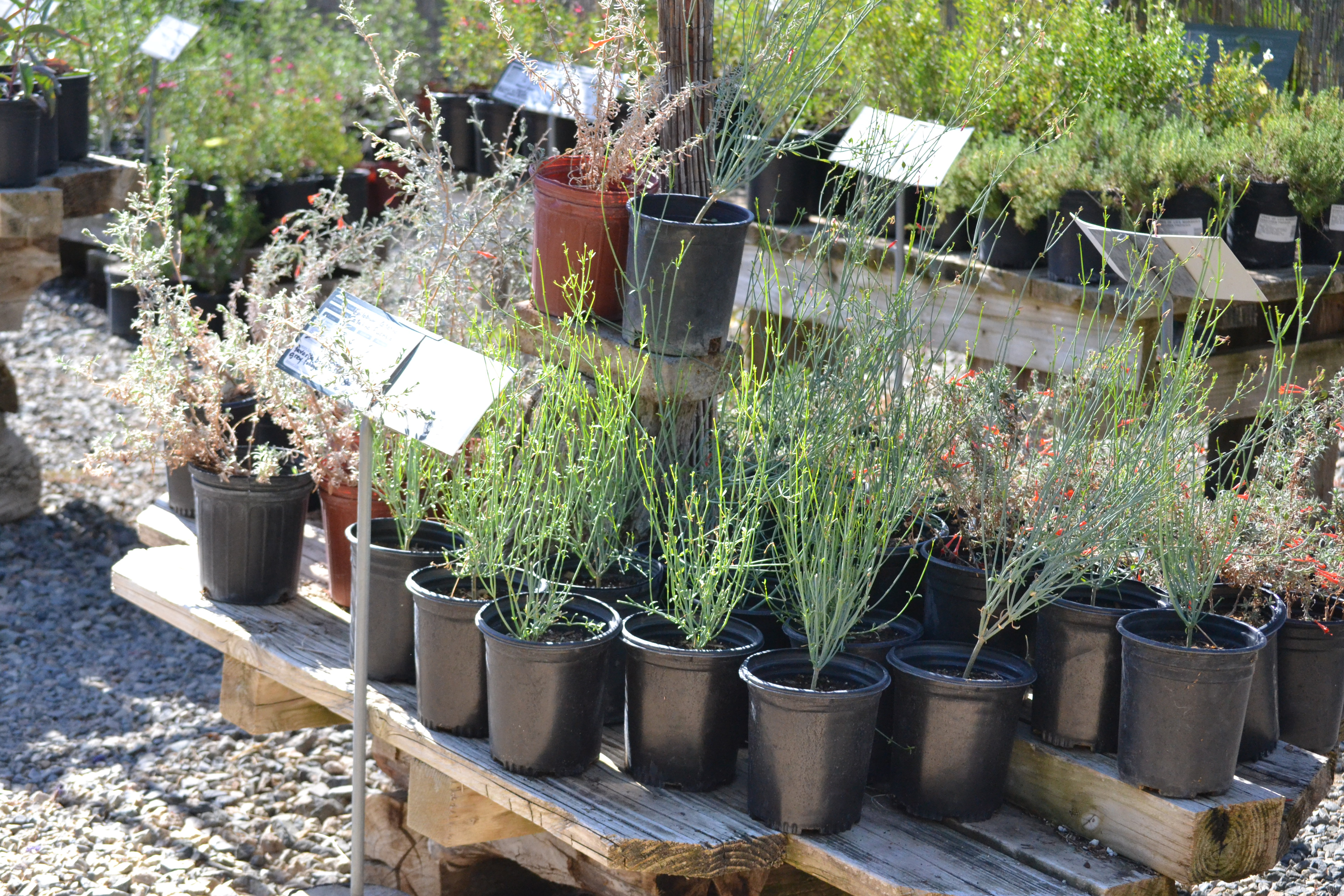
Gambelia juncea in cultivation at Tree of Life Nursery in San Juan Capistrano.

Gambelia juncea is utilized in the garden setting as a showy ornamental that requires little water, tolerates a wide range of soils, and flowers nearly year-round with minimal irrigation. The long, red, tubular flowers are attractive to hummingbirds and butterflies. A fine-textured shrub, this species works well for background areas or in combination with bolder native plants and succulents.

This species tolerates well-draining to clay soils. It is well-suited for areas with droughts, aridity, and all-day sun, and is recommended as erosion control for slopes. Water requirements are minimal, as winter rains provide sufficient moisture, but supplemental irrigation during spring months will provide a longer bloom period. This species is not able to tolerate frost.

Various cultivars exist, including 'Punta Banda', introduced by Tree of Life Nursery from the Punta Banda of Ensenada, and 'Grand Cañon', selected by the Santa Barbara Botanic Garden from Cedros Island. Growth habits and appearance vary with cultivar. 'Punta Banda' plants have light-green leaves and form a tightly-woven, dense, mounding shrub, while 'Grand Cañon' plants have an upright, arching form.

== See also ==
Other plants of the Baja California Peninsula with tubular red flowers:

- Xylonagra
- Justicia californica and purpusii
- Fouquieria diguetii
- Dudleya rigida
