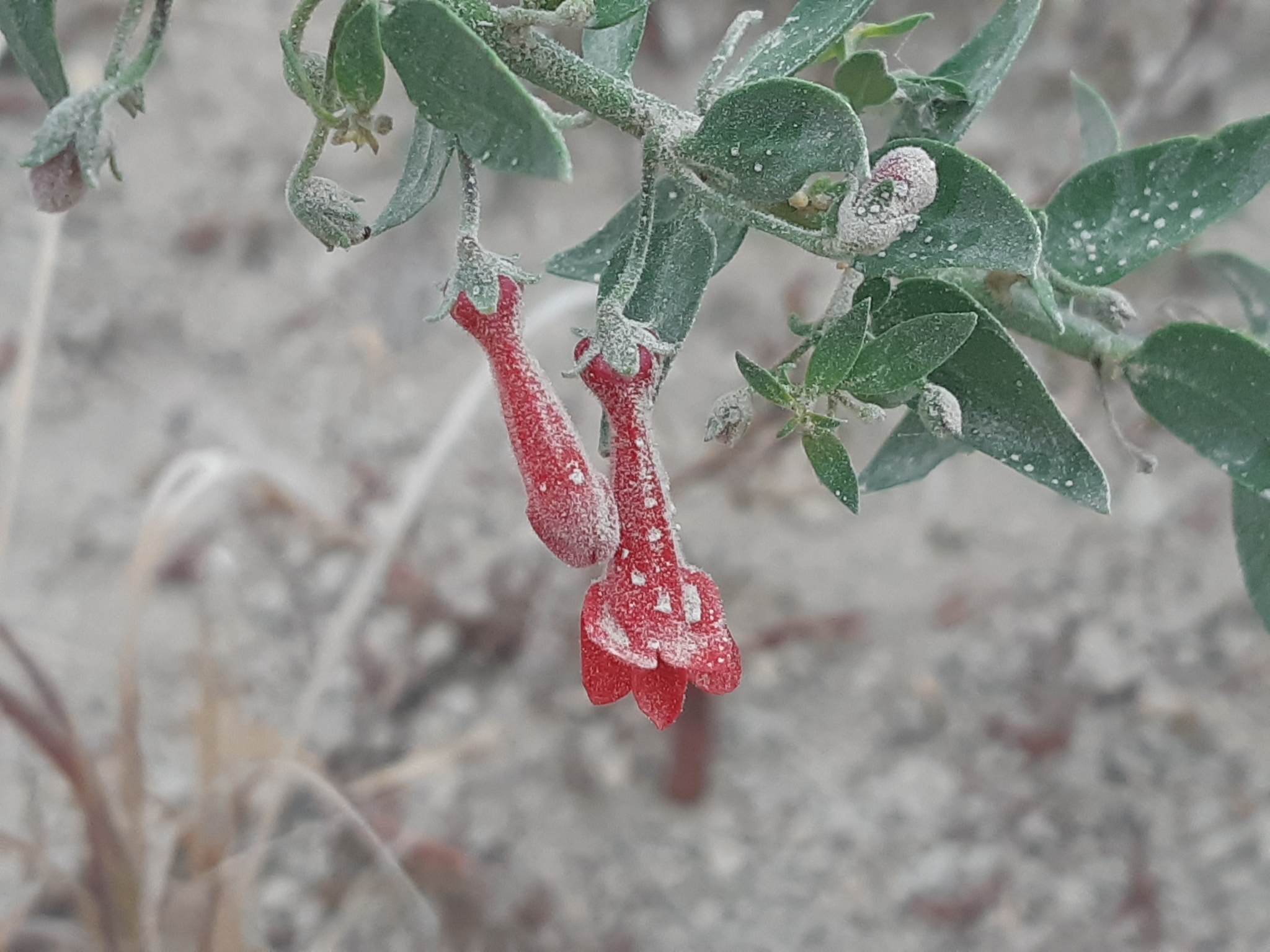
- Galvezia lanceolata

Scientific classification
- Kingdom: Plantae
- Clade: Tracheophytes
- Clade: Angiosperms
- Clade: Eudicots
- Clade: Asterids
- Order: Lamiales
- Family: Plantaginaceae
- Tribe: Antirrhineae
- Genus: Galvezia; Dombey ex Juss.

Species
- See text

Synonyms
- Agassizia Chav. (1833)

= Galvezia =

Genus of plants

Galvezia is a genus of perennial plants which are native to western South America and the Galapagos Islands. The genus is currently placed in the family Plantaginaceae, having been formerly classified under Scrophulariaceae. It is named in honour of José de Gálvez, a colonial official in New Spain during the 1700s.

== Taxonomy ==
Species accepted by Kew include:

- Galvezia elisensii M.O.Dillon & Quip. – Native to Peru.
- Galvezia fruticosa J.F. Gmel. – Native to Ecuador and Peru.
- Galvezia grandiflora (Benth.) Wettst. – Native to northwest Peru.
- Galvezia lanceolata Pennell – Native to Ecuador.
- Galvezia leucantha Wiggins – Native to Ecuador and the Galapagos Islands.

Two North American species were formerly placed in Galvezia, but are now recognized as distinct and placed in the genus Gambelia:

- Gambelia juncea (Benth.) D.A.Sutton [syn. Galvezia juncea (Benth.) Ball] – Native to the Baja California peninsula and Sonora, Mexico.
- Gambelia speciosa Nutt. [syn. Galvezia speciosa (Nutt.) A.Gray] – Native to the Channel Islands of California in California and Guadalupe Island, Mexico.
