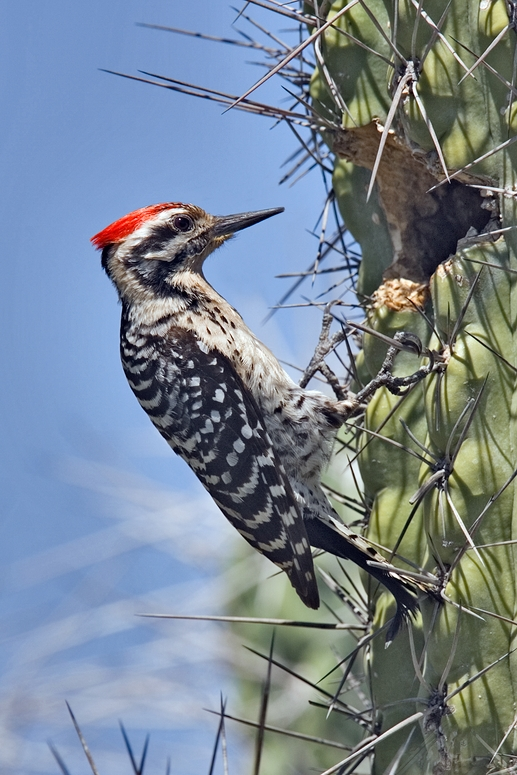
- Adult male outside cavity

Conservation status
- Least Concern (IUCN 3.1)

Scientific classification
- Kingdom: Animalia
- Phylum: Chordata
- Class: Aves
- Order: Piciformes
- Family: Picidae
- Genus: Dryobates
- Species: D. scalaris

Binomial name
- Dryobates scalaris (Wagler, 1829)
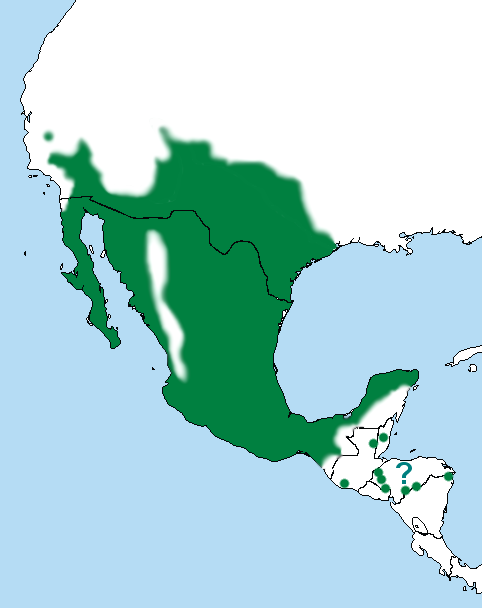

Synonyms
- Dendrocopos scalaris Picoides scalaris

= Ladder-backed woodpecker =

Species of bird

The ladder-backed woodpecker (Dryobates scalaris) is a North American woodpecker.

== Description ==
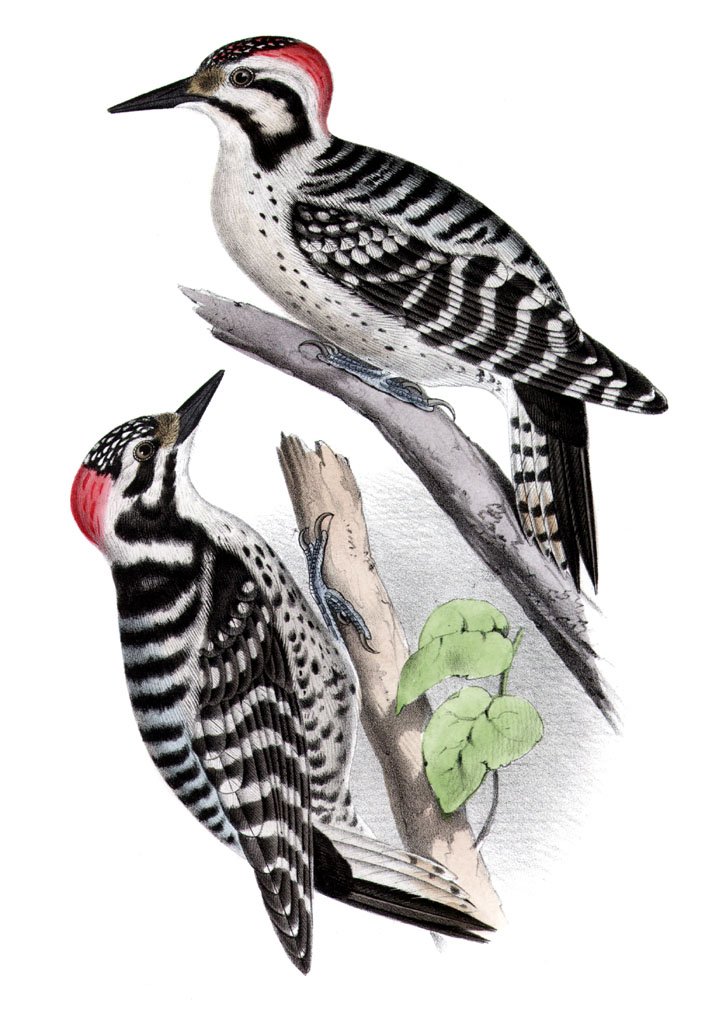
Comparison of ladder-backed (above) and Nuttall's woodpecker

The ladder-backed woodpecker is a small woodpecker about 16.5 to 19 cm (6½ to 7½ inches) in length. It is primarily colored black and white, with a barred pattern on its back and wings resembling the rungs of a ladder. Its rump is speckled with black, as are its cream-colored underparts on the breast and flanks. Southern populations have duskier buff breasts and distinctly smaller bills. Adult males have a red crown patch that is smaller in immatures and lacking in adult females. The ladder-backed woodpecker is very similar in appearance to Nuttall's woodpecker, but has much less black on its head and upper back, and the range of the two species only intersects a minimal amount in southern California and northern Baja California. Hybrids are known.

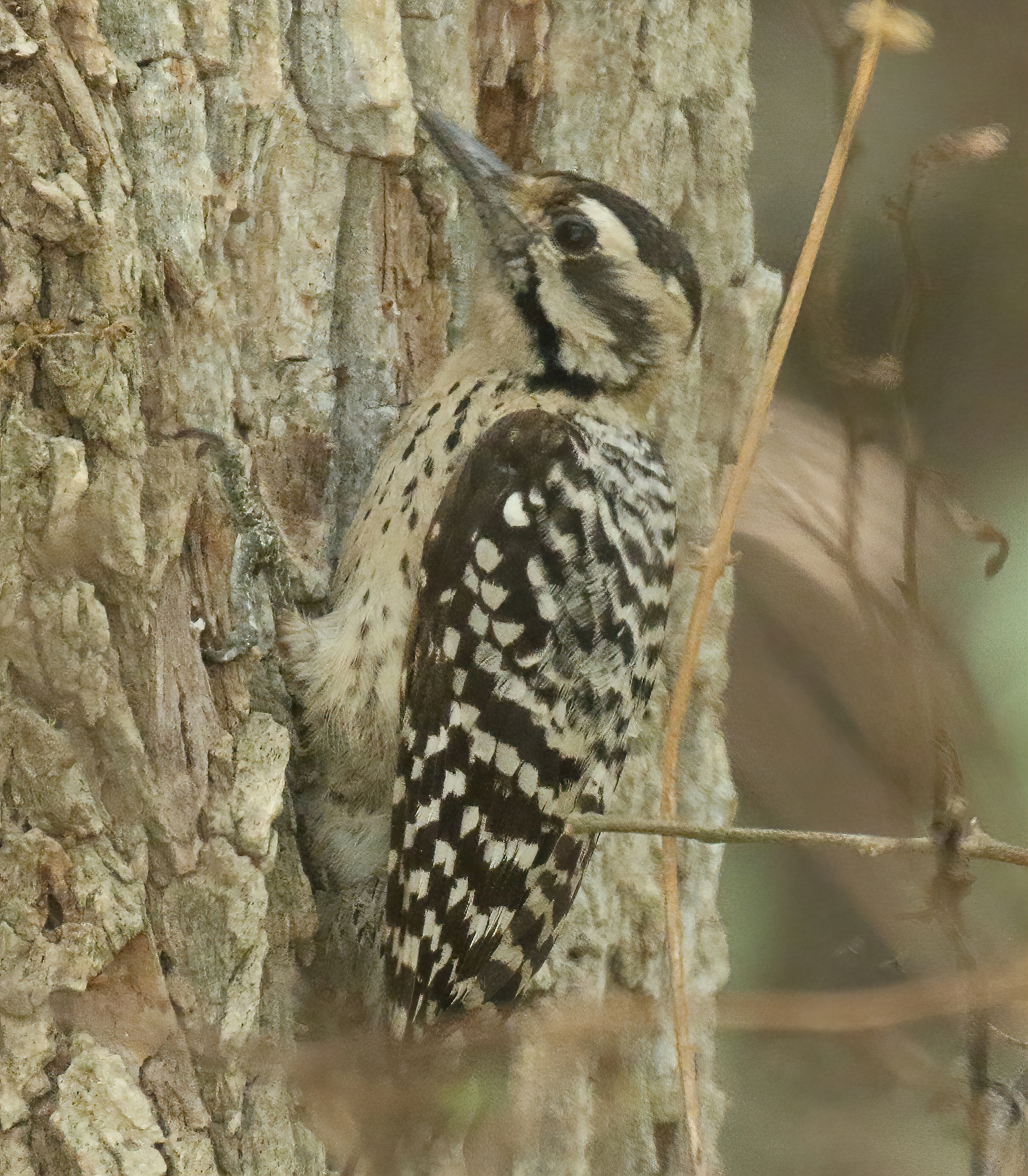
Female - South Padre Island, Texas

Ladder-backed woodpeckers nest in cavities excavated from tree trunks, or in more arid environments a large cactus will do. The female lays between 2 and 7 eggs, which are plain white. The eggs are incubated by both sexes, but the nesting period and other details are unknown.

Like most other woodpeckers the ladder-backed woodpecker bores into tree-trunks with its chisel-like bill to hunt for insects and their larva, but it also feeds on fruit produced by cacti.

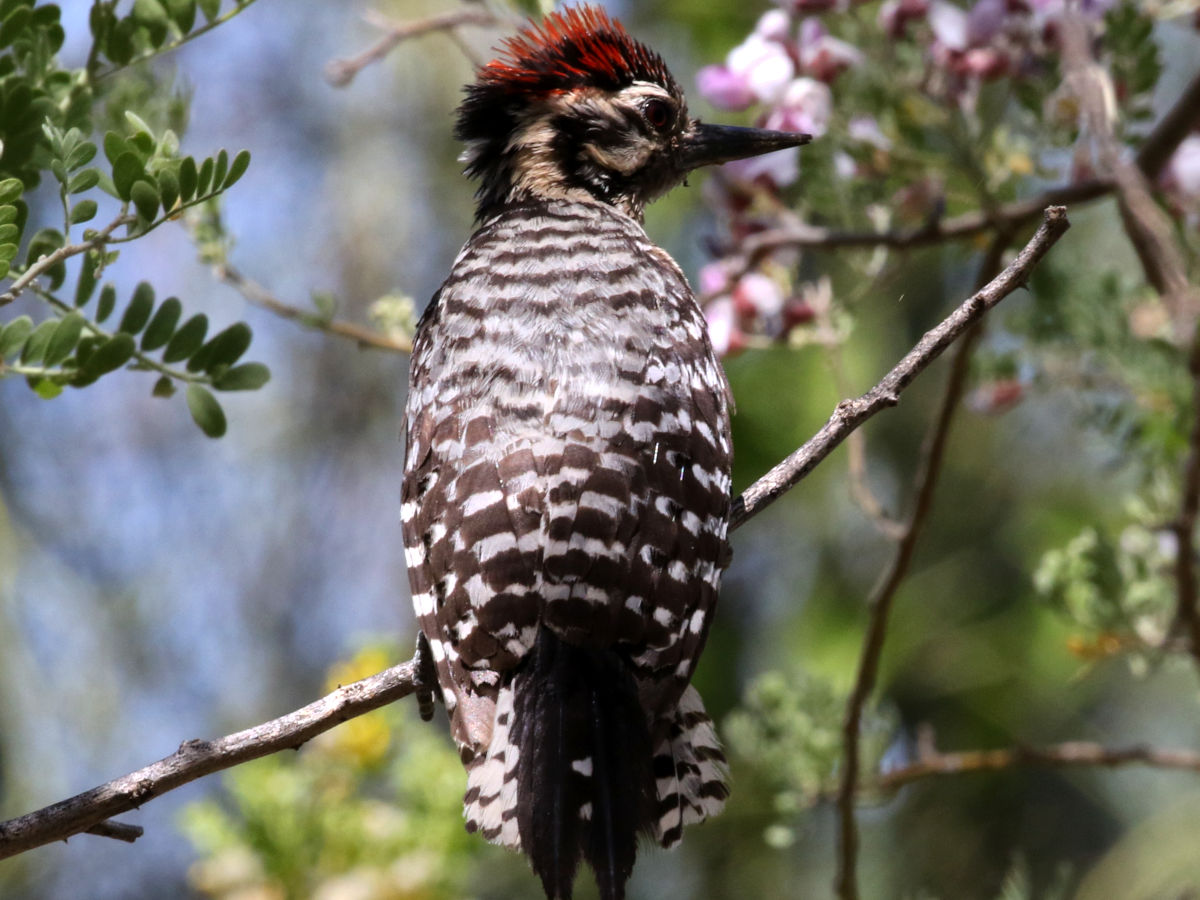
Juvenile male showing ladder back

== Range and habitat ==
The ladder-backed woodpecker is fairly common in dry brushy areas and thickets and has a rather large range. The species can be found year-round over the southwestern United States (north to extreme southern Nevada and extreme southeastern Colorado), most of Mexico, and locally in Central America as far south as Nicaragua.
