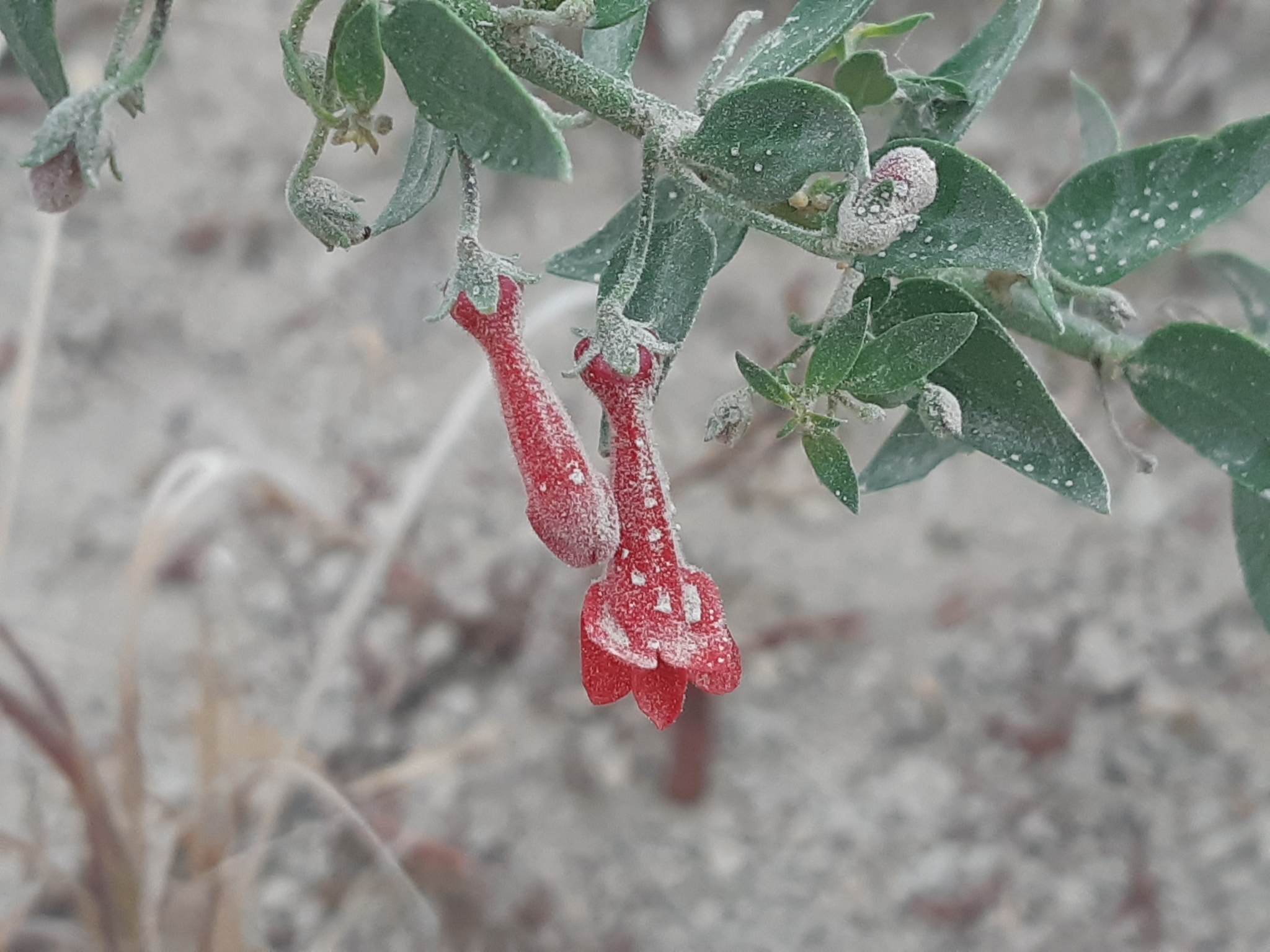

Conservation status
- Vulnerable (IUCN 3.1)

Scientific classification
- Kingdom: Plantae
- Clade: Tracheophytes
- Clade: Angiosperms
- Clade: Eudicots
- Clade: Asterids
- Order: Lamiales
- Family: Plantaginaceae
- Genus: Galvezia
- Species: G. lanceolata

Binomial name
- Galvezia lanceolata Pennell

= Galvezia lanceolata =

Species of flowering plant

Galvezia lanceolata is a species of plant in the family Plantaginaceae. It is endemic to Ecuador.
