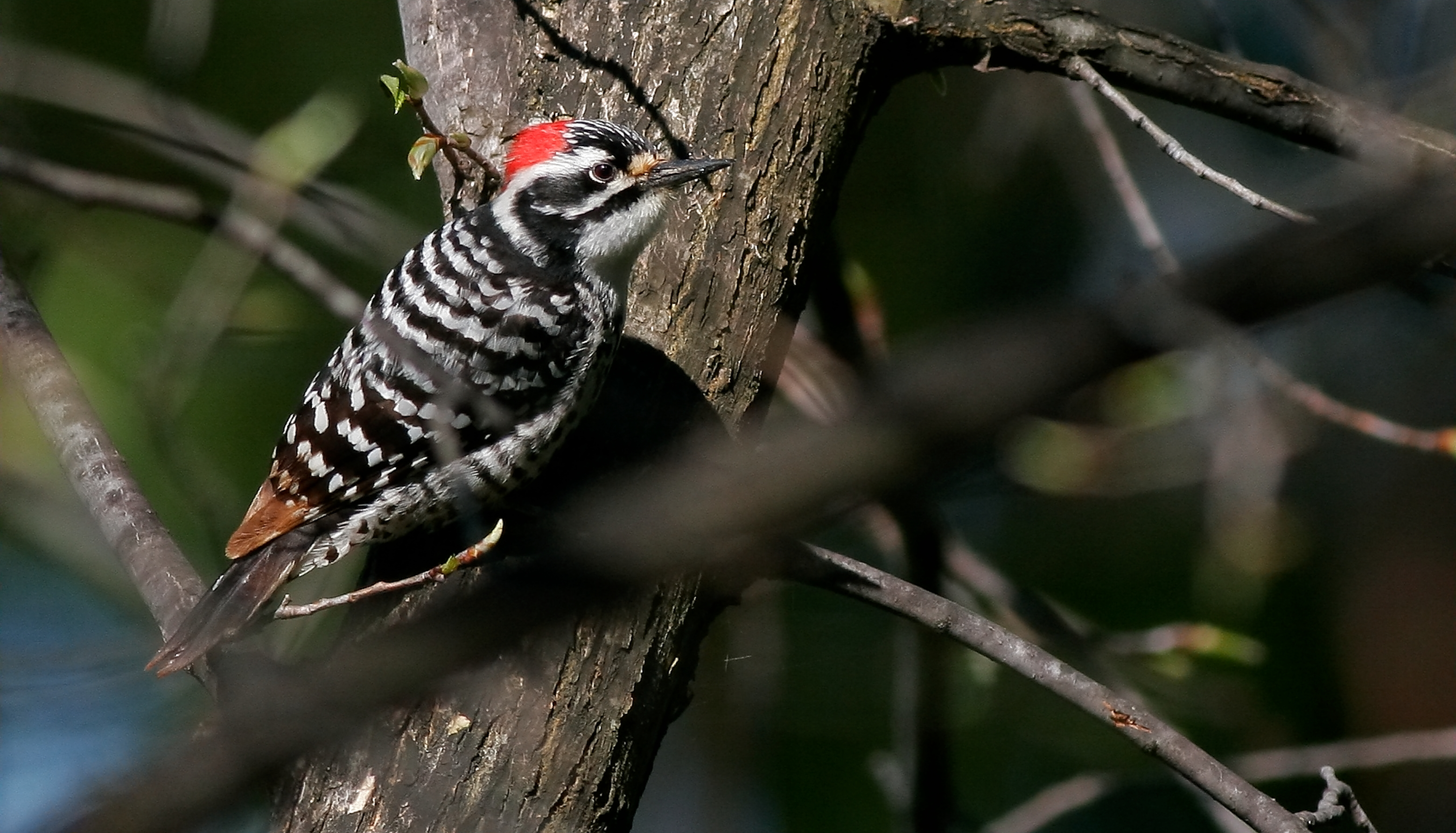
- Male in Sacramento, California
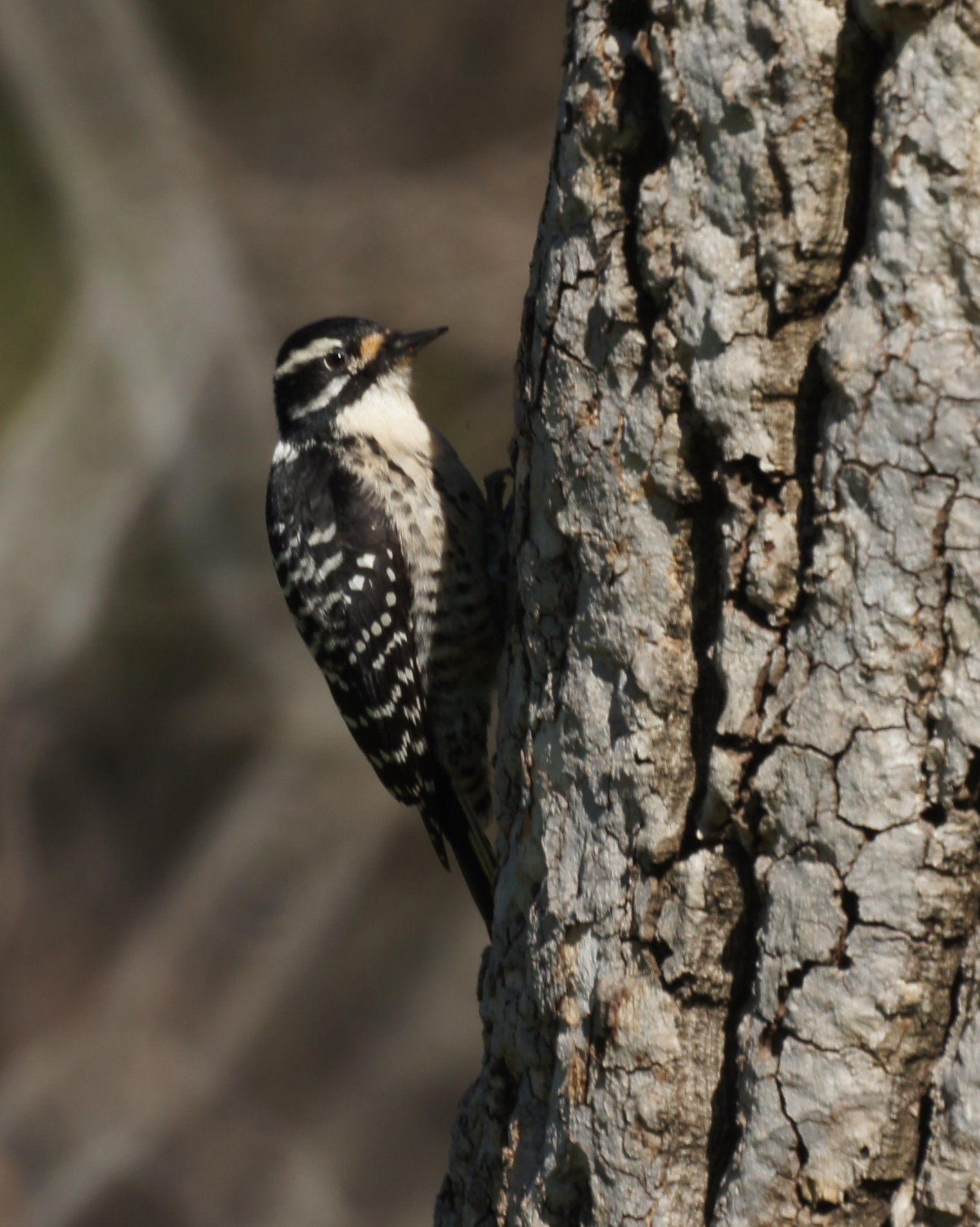
- Female in Sylmar, California

Conservation status
- Least Concern (IUCN 3.1)

Scientific classification
- Kingdom: Animalia
- Phylum: Chordata
- Class: Aves
- Order: Piciformes
- Family: Picidae
- Genus: Dryobates
- Species: D. nuttallii

Binomial name
- Dryobates nuttallii (Gambel, 1843)
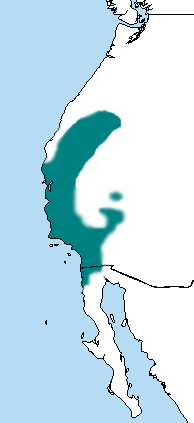
- Range of P. nuttallii

Synonyms
- Dendrocopos nuttallii Picoides nuttallii

= Nuttall's woodpecker =

Species of bird

Nuttall's woodpecker (Dryobates nuttallii) is a species of woodpecker named after naturalist Thomas Nuttall in 1843. They are found in oak woodlands of California and are similar to the ladder-backed woodpecker in both genetics and appearance.

== Description ==
Nuttall's woodpecker has striped black and white patterned wings and tail feathers with white. Its undercarriage is a primarily white coat with a few spotted black regions. It has a black forehead with white streaks on the sides and an unbarred black region at the top of the back. Adult males have a distinguishable red crown which females do not. However, this physical feature is present in the juvenile of both sexes. Juvenile birds look nearly identical to adults, excluding that juveniles typically have some white color in the form of streaks on their heads. They have zygodactyl feet, where the two toes facing forward and two facing backward along with stiff tail feathers which allows them to maintain a secure, vertical position on trees; typical of woodpeckers. The mass of the Nuttall's woodpecker ranges from 30 to 45 g (1.1 to 1.6 oz), with a body length of 16 to 18 cm (6.3 to 7.1 in). It is traditionally classified a small to medium sized bird that correlates to a wingspan length of approximately 38 to 43 cm in length. While commonly mistaken for Down and Hairy Woodpeckers, it contains horizontal strips on its back which distinguishes it from such species.

== Taxonomy ==
Nuttall’s woodpecker is part of genus Dyrobates, coined by German naturalist Friedrich Boie in 1826 with his discovery of the downy woodpecker as the type species. The genus name Dryobates is derived from the Greek compound word dryós, meaning woodland walker’ and -bátēs meaning ‘walker’. The genus contains birds in the woodpecker family Picdae. The Nuttall's woodpecker is closely related to the ladder-backed woodpecker of Arizona, New Mexico, Texas, and Mexico. While often mistaken for the ladder-backed woodpecker, Nuttall’s woodpecker has a solid black area on its upper back while the Ladder-backed has barring that continues down to the nape. They likely share ancestry through a common ancestor, but little to no information is known about the evolution and therefore lineage classification of Nuttall’s woodpecker. Significant study is needed to determine the genetic link and commonality in behaviors between the two species. The Nuttall's likely evolved via allopatric speciation when the two species were separated into smaller ranges by dry climate during the Pleistocene glaciation. Hybrids of the two species exist but are rare.

== Habitat and distribution ==
Nuttall's are a non-migratory species with a geographic range extending from northern California south to the northwest region of Baja California, Mexico. Their preferred habitat is arid to mesic woodlands. In particular, these woodpeckers prefer oak woodlands, although they also occur in riparian sites and chaparral in the most southern parts of their range because of the decrease in oak abundance. Individuals are found from sea level to 1,250 m (4,100 ft), rarely to 2,000 m (6,600 ft). Although they have been found as far east as Central Wyoming. However, year-round sightings of the bird indicate its geographical range is limited to Northern California, just below the border of Oregon down until the city of Ensenada in Baja California. It is generally west of the deserts and the Sierra divide. In California particularly, the species is from the Shasta and northwestern Lassen counties to southward in the foothills of eastern Trinity and southeastern Mendocino counties, to the Pacific Coast at Sonoma County and south towards the Los Angeles counties. In southern California, its range extends along riparian habitats into deserts and along the lower slopes of the mountains in eastern San Diego County.

The birds are not considered globally threatened although the range is restricted to the California Endemic Bird Area. They are fairly common in California with a total world population estimated at over 100,000 individuals (density of about 20 birds per square kilometer in San Bernardino County). Surveys suggest no obvious population trends. It has also demonstrated adaptation to urban areas, where habitation in suburban and man-made natural areas, such as parks, have seen Nuttall’s woodpecker nesting in street trees or implementing deadwood into diet.

== Behavior ==
=== Vocalizations ===
Vocalizations performed by Nuttall's woodpecker are considered to be not of any harmonic. Some vocalizations have been described:

- Call note: used between mated pairs to communicate their location to each other.
- Double call: same function as call note can but also be used as a low threat alarm call.
- Rattle call: used to establish territories when feeding
- Kweek call: used between sexes mainly by female prior to copulation.

Both sexes drum. Rolls are relatively long, averaging over one second.

=== Diet ===
Nuttall's woodpecker feeds primarily on insect larvae such as those of wood borers, click beetles, and ants, found by tapping and probing into the crevices in oak trees. It is estimated that adult and larval insects, with an emphasis on beetles, construct nearly 80% of their diet. The bird also feeds on sap from sap holes created by red-breasted sapsuckers in birch and willow, and consumes a variety of berry seeds. While feeding, it uses its rigid tail and sturdy feet to stabilize itself on branches. It also accesses the tree sap, particularly from oaks since they provide a plentiful source of nutrients during colder seasons in which insects may become dormant or less active.

=== Feeding ===
Its strong beak is used to drill into tree trunks and branches to remove branch pieces in order to extract insects. A common behavior is to peel back tree layers to expose ant colonies inhabited within bark. The woodpeckers hammer their beaks into the trees at speeds of 13 to 15 miles per hour (21 to 25 kilometers per hour). This results in 18 to 22 hits on a tree per second, and a total of 12,000 times per day by liberal estimates. In order to survive the deceleration forces of 1200 g with each strike, they have mechanisms and bone structure that creates absorbent forces. Composition wise, their skull consists of a variety of bones that is spaced in a spongelike pattern to absorb shocks. With this, the hyoid bone, which similarly is composed of multiple bones, enters the tongue by way of wrapping around the skulls from the nostrils. This results in the unique ability for the hyoid bone as a protective, seatbelt-like preventive measure for the head that restrains it to absorb stress. Finally, their bill is turned slightly downward in a way that deflects some of the energy, in combination with its elasticity.

=== Reproduction ===
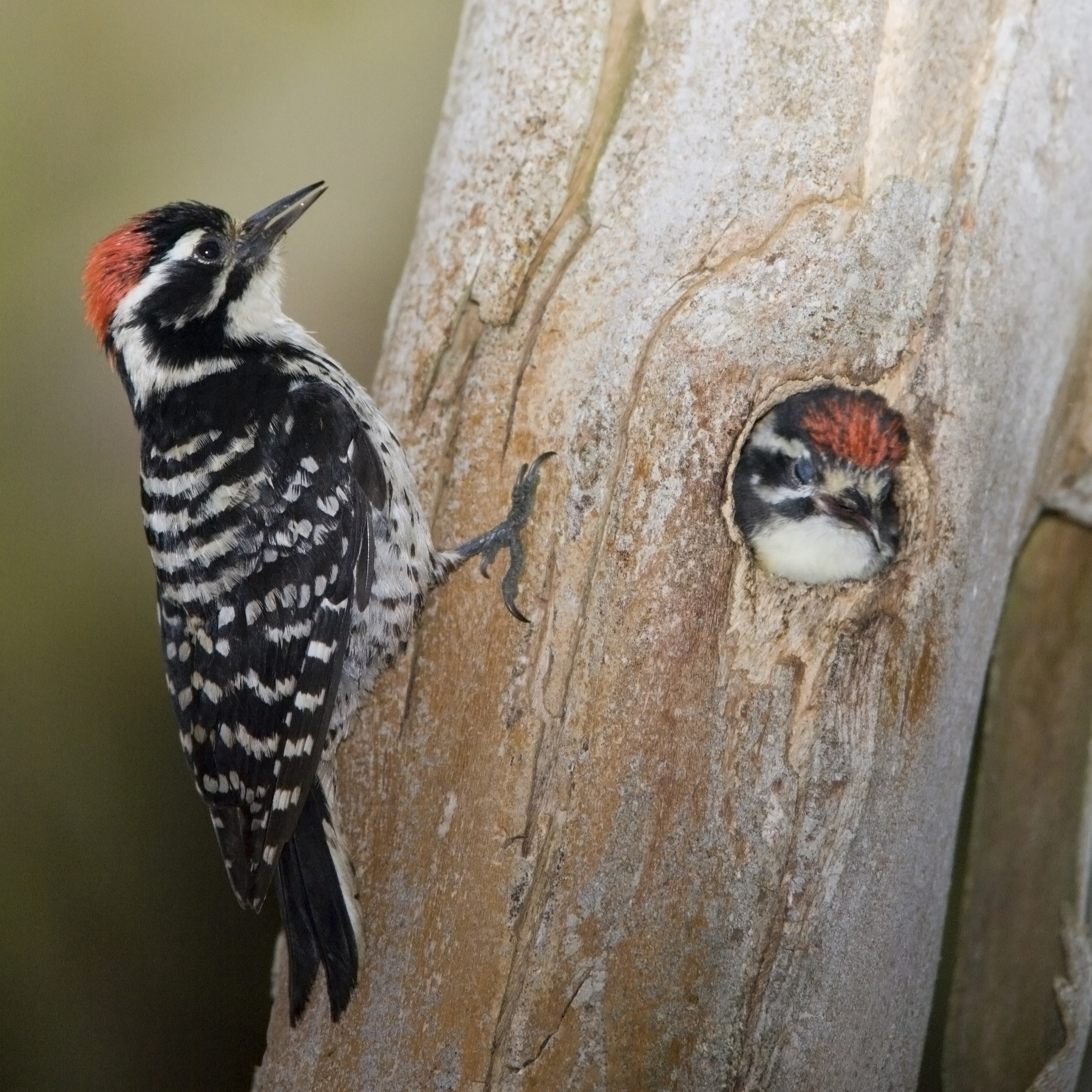
Male and chick in a nest

Pair bonding occurs in late January to March with egg-laying mostly in April and May. When male and female Nuttall Woodpeckers come into contact, they exchange soft wheezing calls which are similar to but less intense than the rattle calls used territorially. Starting in late January both sexes, especially the males, drum on their ranges. Average clutch size has been reported to be around 4.6 eggs. Nuttall's woodpeckers are socially monogamous and show displays of bi-parental care. New nests are excavated each year by males in the cavities of dead trees such as willow, oak, and alder. These nesting cavities are found from ground level to about 18 meters (60 feet) above ground. The birds aggressively protect their nest sites against predators and coexisting species alike. Clutch sizes range from three to six eggs with the male partner incubating the eggs at night and the female during the day. Incubation period can be up to 14 days. Fledglings are able to leave the nest around 29 days post hatch with parental care continuing for 14 days after that. After fledging level, the adults become inactive and tend to remain in solitary once contact with the juveniles ends.

== Additional images ==
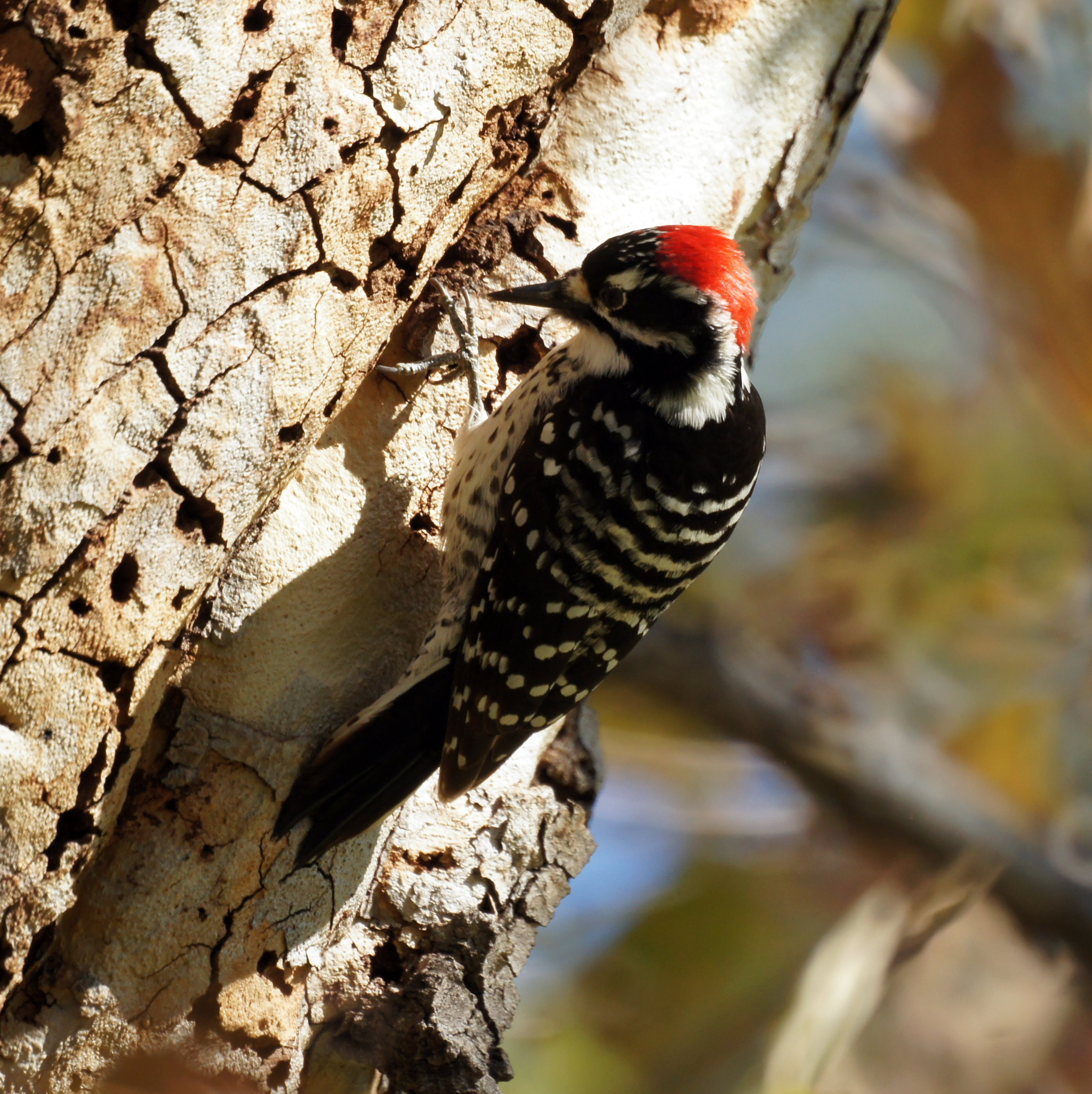
Male in Sylmar, California, USA
