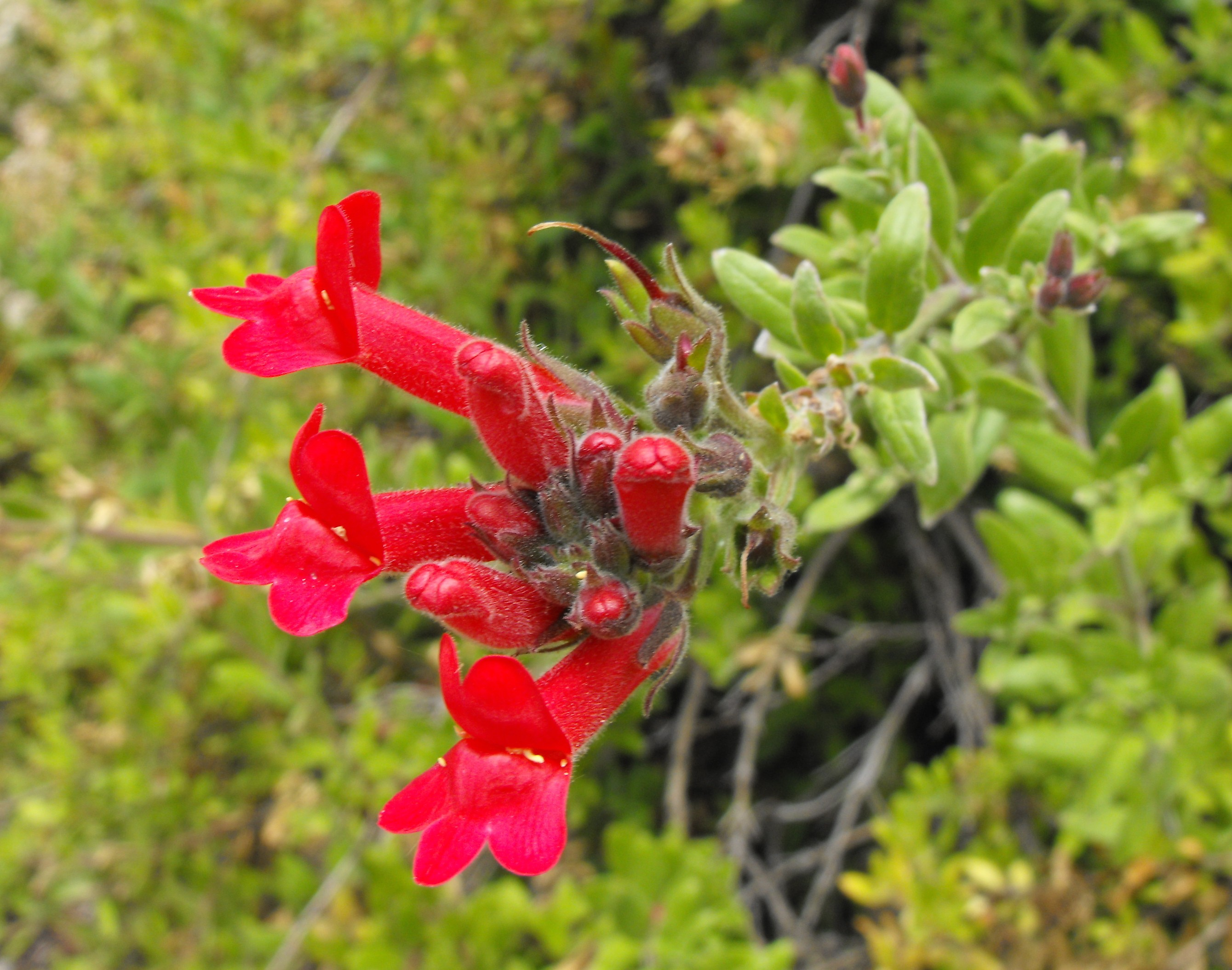
- Gambelia speciosa

Scientific classification
- Kingdom: Plantae
- Clade: Tracheophytes
- Clade: Angiosperms
- Clade: Eudicots
- Clade: Asterids
- Order: Lamiales
- Family: Plantaginaceae
- Tribe: Antirrhineae
- Genus: Gambelia; Nutt.

Type species
- Gambelia speciosa Nutt.

= Gambelia (plant) =

Genus of flowering plants

Gambelia is a genus of flowering plants in the Antirrhineae tribe of the plantain family commonly known as bush snapdragons. This genus is native to northwestern Mexico, particularly the Baja California Peninsula, but species are also found on the coast of Sonora, Guadalupe Island, and the Channel Islands of California. The genus is named in honor of William Gambel (1823–1849), an American naturalist, ornithologist, and botanist.

== Species ==
Two species are commonly accepted:

- Gambelia juncea (Benth.) D.A.Sutton
- Gambelia speciosa Nutt.

Two other species, originally described by Townshend Stith Brandegee from the Cape region of Baja California Sur, are recognized by Kew's Plants of the World Online as of 2022, but treated by other sources as just variable populations within the polymorphic Gambelia juncea. See the taxonomy section of Gambelia juncea for details:

- Gambelia glabrata (Brandegee) D.A. Sutton
- Gambelia rupicola (Brandegee) D.A. Sutton

The genus Gambelia was previously submerged into the similar South American genus Galvezia. However, genetic and morphological analyses have supported the separation of the North and South American species into two genera.
