= William Gambel =

American naturalist, ornithologist, and botanist

- Born: William Gamble, Jr. June 1823; Philadelphia, USA
- Died: December 13, 1849 aged 26; Miners' camp, Yuba River, California USA
- Education: University of Pennsylvania
- Spouse: Catherine Towson
- Parent(s): William Gamble, Sr. and Elizabeth Gamble
- Scientific career
- Fields: Ornithology, botany
- Author abbrev. (zoology): Gambel

William Gambel (June 1823 – December 13, 1849) was an American naturalist, ornithologist, and botanist from Philadelphia. As a young man he worked closely with the renowned naturalist Thomas Nuttall. At the age of eighteen he traveled overland to California, becoming the first botanist to collect specimens in Santa Fe, New Mexico, and parts of California.

== Biography ==
Gambel was born William Gamble Jr. in Philadelphia in June 1823. His father, William Gamble Sr., had immigrated from Northern Ireland and served in the War of 1812. After the death of his first wife, Gamble Sr. moved to Philadelphia, where he married Elizabeth Gamble in August 1822. They had three children: William and two daughters. Gamble Sr. died of pneumonia in 1832, and Elizabeth Gamble was left to raise the children on her own.

William proved to be a good student, perhaps influenced by his mother, who worked as a school teacher. For unexplained reasons, he began spelling his surname Gambel. In 1838 Gambel met the renowned naturalist Thomas Nuttall, and they quickly became friends. Nuttall had a broad expertise in all aspects of natural history, and through his influence, Gambel developed an affinity for botany, mineralogy, and ornithology. For the next few years Gambel served as a sort of apprentice for Nuttall.

In late 1838, they traveled together on a collecting trip to the Carolinas and the southern Appalachians. They returned to Philadelphia in April 1839 and then quickly set off again for a field trip to New Jersey to study and collect pre-Cambrian limestone minerals. In October 1839, they were back in Philadelphia to attend a meeting of the Philadelphia Academy of Natural Sciences, where Gambel presented a gold nugget from North Carolina for the museum collection. In February 1840, Gambel accompanied Nuttall to Cambridge, Massachusetts where Nuttall had been invited to present a series of lectures at the Lowell Institute. They also made a couple of field trips to Maine, where they collected mineral specimens. By August 1840, the lecture series had ended and they returned to Philadelphia.

In March 1841, at the age of eighteen, Gambel set off on his own for California to collect plants and other specimens for Nuttall. He planned to take a more southerly route than that taken in 1834 by Nuttall and John Kirk Townsend. Upon reaching Independence, Missouri, he joined a group of traders and headed for Santa Fe, following the Santa Fe Trail. Gambel reached Santa Fe in June and spent the next couple months collecting plants. In September, Gambel joined a party heading to California and accompanied them along the Old Spanish Trail, arriving in Mexican Alta California in early November 1841, becoming the first botanist to enter California overland from the east.

Gambel spent the next year collecting along the coast from Los Angeles up to Monterey. In February 1842, he became the first botanist to collect on Santa Catalina Island off the coast of California. In addition to plants, Gambel collected bird specimens and observed them in their habitat. He later published his observations in Remarks on birds observed in Upper California, with descriptions of new species (1847/1849). The new bird species he collected included Gambel's quail (Callipepla gambelii), mountain chickadee (Parus gambeli) and Nuttall's woodpecker (Picoides nuttallii).

By midsummer, Gambel was out of money and became a clerk on the US Navy ship Cyane, commanded by Thomas ap Catesby Jones. For the next three years, Gambel served on several navy ships, visiting Mexico, the Hawaiian Islands, Tahiti, the Marquesas Islands, Peru and Chile. In a letter to his mother, Gambel said he had "sailed farther than twice around the world." In March 1845, his ship left Chile and sailed to the East Coast via Cape Horn. Gambel returned to Philadelphia by July 1845.

While Gambel was in California, Nuttall returned home to England, where he remained for the rest of his life. In Philadelphia, Gambel published some of his zoological findings and sent many of his botanical specimens to Nuttall for publication. In 1845, Gambel entered the medical school at the University of Pennsylvania and received a medical degree in March 1848. He married Catherine Towson, a childhood sweetheart, in October. He also served briefly as the Recording Secretary at the Academy of Natural Sciences.

Gambel soon encountered difficulty in establishing a medical practice in Philadelphia. California was booming because of the Gold Rush and presented an opportunity for a new doctor. He shipped his medical books and equipment by sea and made arrangements for his wife to join him after he became settled. On April 5, 1849, Gambel and an acquaintance, Isaac Wistar, left for the difficult overland journey to California. In Independence, Missouri, they formed a larger party led by Wistar and made good progress westward. However, Gambel grew tired of the group's fast pace and joined a slower-moving ox-train led by Captain Boone of Kentucky. Boone offered to relieve Gambel of any camp duties in exchange for his medical services.

The Boone party did not fare well crossing the deserts and mountains of the Great Basin. Most of the livestock and wagons were lost by the time they reached the Sierra Nevada range in October. Early snows were already falling in the high country, but Gambel and a few others pushed on to the western slopes. In December, Gambel reached Rose's Bar, a gold mining camp on the Yuba River. The settlement was in the midst of a typhoid epidemic. Gambel tried to treat the ill miners, but he became sick himself and died December 13, 1849. He was buried at the base of a giant ponderosa pine, but the entire site was soon washed away by hydraulic mining.

Animals named in his honor include the Gambel's quail and Gambelia, the genus of lizards. In 1848, a genus of flowering plants, Gambelia, from California and Mexico, was named after him. The common name and specific epithet of Gambel's oak, Quercus gambelii, honors William Gambel.
