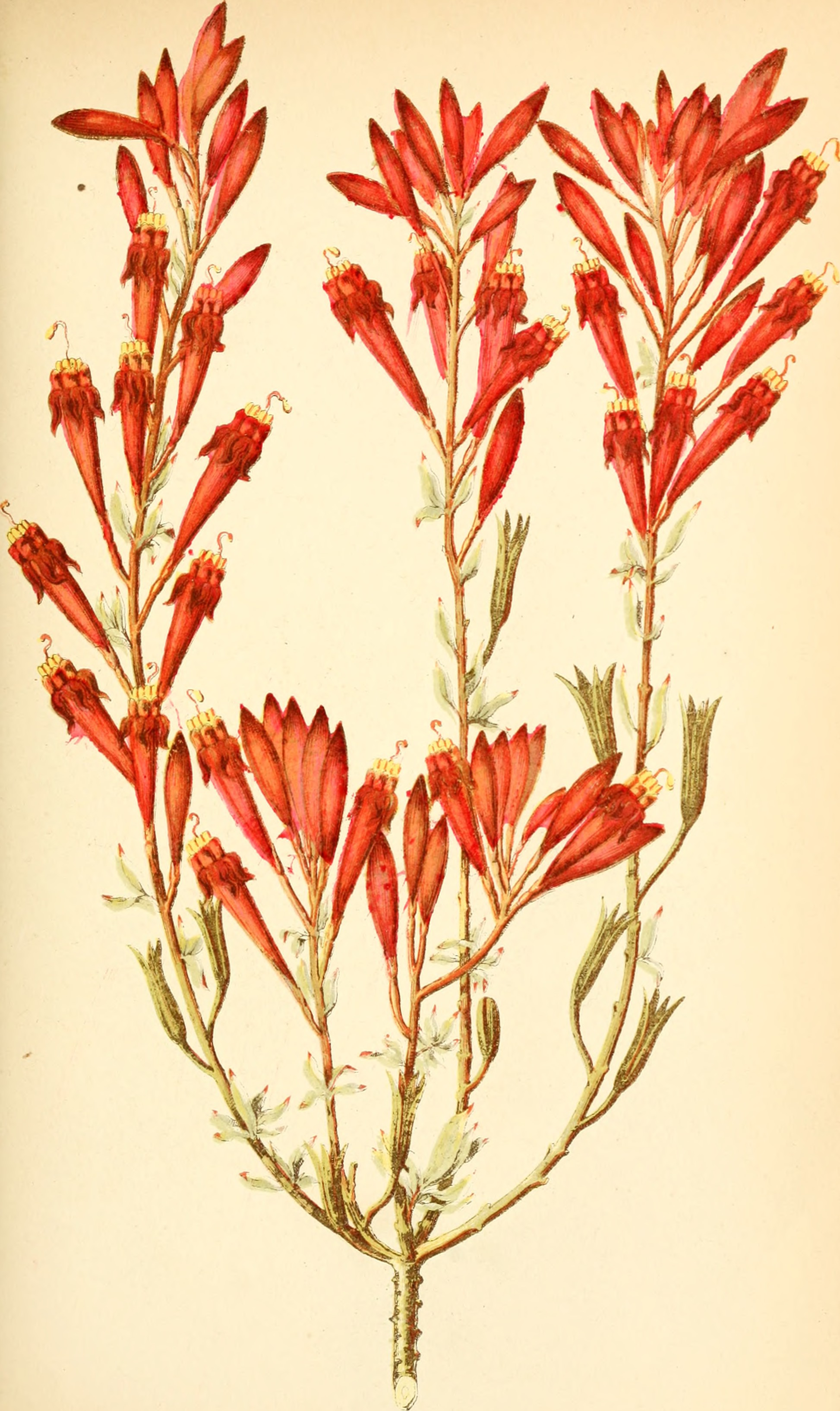
- Botanical illustration

Scientific classification
- Kingdom: Plantae
- Clade: Tracheophytes
- Clade: Angiosperms
- Clade: Eudicots
- Clade: Rosids
- Order: Myrtales
- Family: Onagraceae
- Subfamily: Onagroideae
- Tribe: Onagreae
- Genus: Xylonagra; Donn.Sm. & Rose
- Species: X. arborea

Binomial name
- Xylonagra arborea (Kell.) Donn.Sm. & Rose

Synonyms
- Oenothera arborea Kell.; Hauya californica Wats.; Hauya arborea Curran

= Xylonagra =

Genus of flowering plants

Xylonagra arborea is a flowering plant endemic to the western side of the Baja California Peninsula. It is a bushy shrub distinguished by showy, scarlet flowers that are attractive to hummingbirds. It is the sole species in the genus Xylonagra, which belongs to the family Onagraceae.

== Description ==
This species is a sparsely-branched bushy shrub that is xerophytic in character. It has bright red flowers, alternate small leaves, and blooms from February to October, or possibly year-round in the event of ample rainfall.

=== Morphology ===
This plant grows as a shrub 5 decimetres (50 cm) to 17 dm (170 cm) high, with the branches largely leafless and slender. The young twigs are slender, simple, and colored reddish. The lanceolate leaves are 8 to 20 mm long, and 2 to 10 mm wide. The petioles are 1 to 5 mm long.

The inflorescence is composed of terminal and usually elongate racemes. There are 4 sepals and petals, and 8 stamens. The pedicels are about 4 to 5 mm long, and thicken in fruit. The floral tube is scarlet, and about 2 cm long, widening upwards near the middle. The sepals are colored scarlet, reflexed, and 8 to 9 mm long. The petals are free, erect, and shaped oblong to obovate, around 6 to 9 mm long. The episepalous (growing on the sepals) stamens are slightly exerted outside the mouth, while the epipetalous (growing on the petals) stamens are within the tube. The style is slender and colored red, slightly exerted. The fruit capsule is around 8 to 12 mm long.

== Taxonomy ==
This species was once within the genus Hauya, but John Donnell Smith and Joseph Nelson Rose split it from the genus and into Xylonagra on the basis of a smaller size, pubescent inner floral tube and the xerophytic character of Xylonagra plants. There are two subspecies of Xylonagra arborea:

=== Subspecies ===
- Xylonagra arborea subsp. arborea – Glandular spreading hairs present on the sepals and young herbage, along with smaller flowers and leaves. Endemic to Cedros Island.
- Xylonagra arborea subsp. wigginsii Munz – The hairs on the younger parts and flowers are very short, and the hairs are not glandular. The leaf blades are up to 20 mm long and 10 mm broad. The floral tube is 2 to 3 cm long. The sepals are 8 to 13 mm long, and the petals are 10 to 18 mm long.

== Distribution and habitat ==
This genus is endemic to the Baja California Peninsula in Mexico. The autonymous subspecies, Xylonagra arborea ssp. arborea, is restricted to Cedros Island off of the coast of the Baja California Peninsula. Subspecies wigginsii is uncommonly distributed from Punta Prieta in southern Baja California state to San Ignacio and the Vizcaino Peninsula of northwestern Baja California Sur. Subspecies wigginsii is also very rarely found on Cedros Island with subspecies arborea.

The plants are primarily found on gravelly mesas near the coast.
