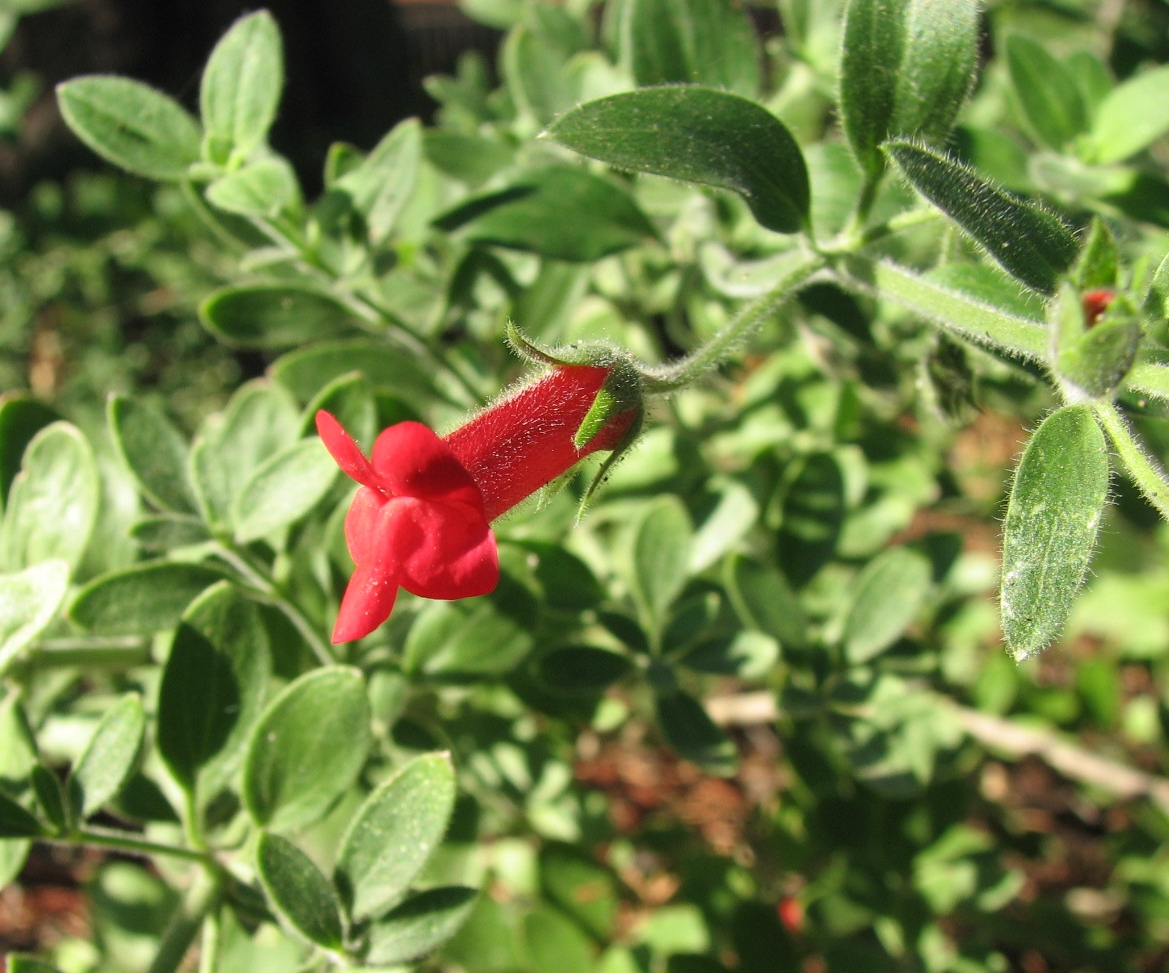

Conservation status
- Vulnerable (NatureServe)

Scientific classification
- Kingdom: Plantae
- Clade: Tracheophytes
- Clade: Angiosperms
- Clade: Eudicots
- Clade: Asterids
- Order: Lamiales
- Family: Plantaginaceae
- Genus: Gambelia
- Species: G. speciosa

Binomial name
- Gambelia speciosa Nutt.

Synonyms
- Antirrhinum speciosum (Nutt.) A.Gray; Galvezia speciosa (Nutt.) A.Gray; Galvezia speciosa var. pubescens Brandegee

= Gambelia speciosa =

Species of flowering plant

Gambelia speciosa, previously classified as Galvezia speciosa, is commonly known as showy island snapdragon or showy greenbright.

It is a perennial plant, which is endemic to California chaparral and woodlands habitats on the Channel Islands in Southern California, and on Guadalupe Island west of the Baja California Peninsula in Baja California, Mexico.

It is listed as an endangered species on the California Native Plant Society Inventory of Rare and Endangered Plants of California.

The genus name of Gambelia is in honour of William Gambel (1823–1849), an American naturalist, ornithologist, and botanist. The Latin epithet of speciosa is derived from speciosus meaning showy. It was first described and published in Proc. Acad. Nat. Sci. Philadelphia Vol. 4 (March–April) on page 7 in 1848.

== Cultivation ==
Gambelia speciosa is cultivated as an ornamental plant for native plant, drought tolerant, and wildlife gardens. It generally prefers a sunny site and well-drained soil, with minimal summer water. The flowers attract hummingbirds.
