= List of invasive species in Florida =

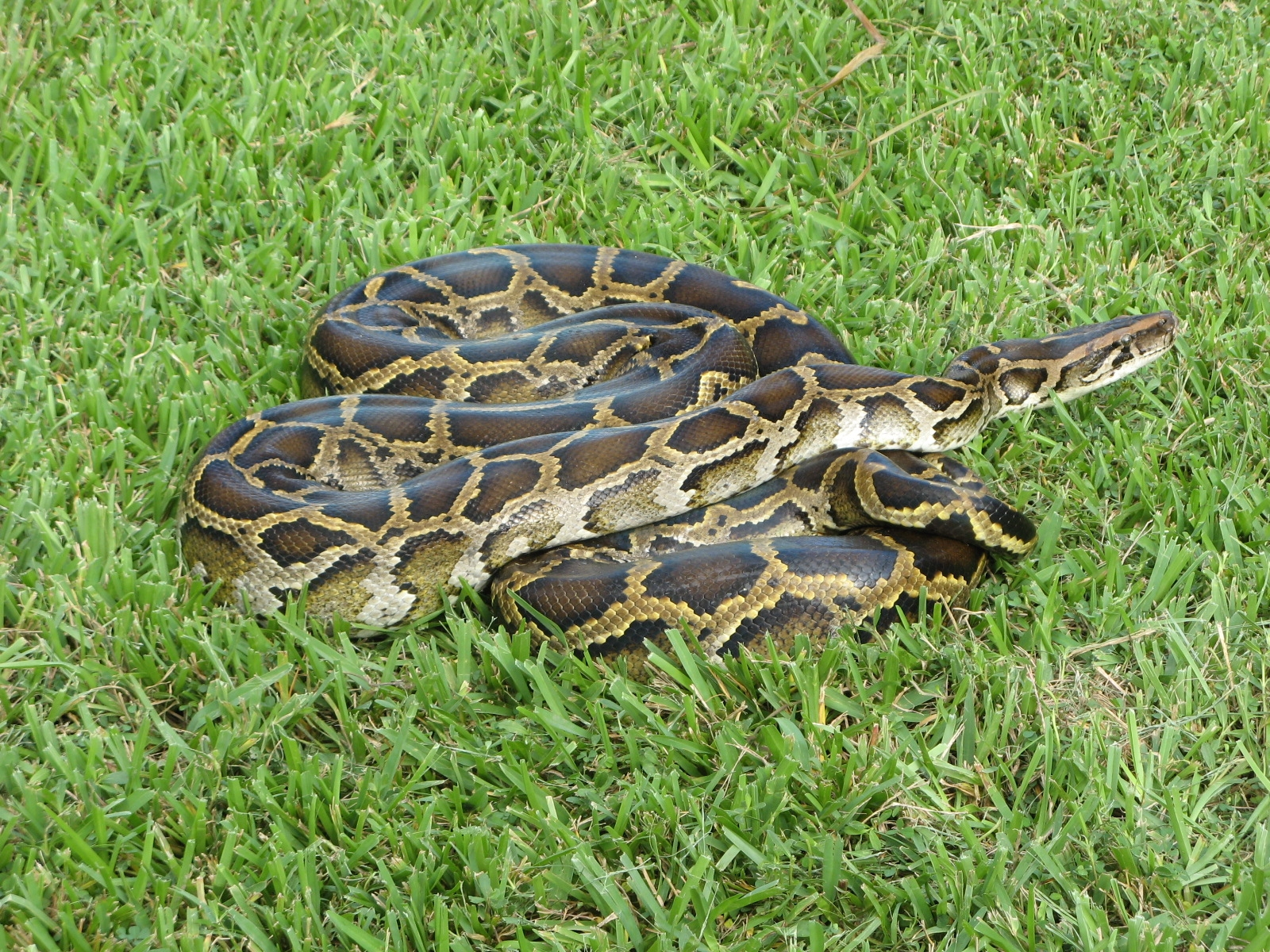
The Burmese python is considered an invasive species in Florida

Invasive species in Florida are introduced organisms that cause damage to the environment, human economy, or human health in Florida. Native plants and animals in Florida are threatened by the spread of invasive species. Florida is a major biodiversity hotspot in North America and the hospitable sub-tropical climate has also become a hotspot for invasive plants and animals due to anthropogenic introduction.

== Animals ==
=== Mammals ===
- Axis axis (Chital)
- Cricetomys gambianus (Gambian pouched rat)
- Chlorocebus sabeus (Green monkey)
- Dasypus novemcinctus (Nine-banded armadillo)
- Felis catus (Feral domestic cat)
- Hydrochoerus hydrochaeris (Capybara)
- Macaca mulatta (Rhesus macaque)
- Mus musculus (House mouse)
- Myocastor coypus (Nutria)
- Rattus norvegicus (Brown rat)
- Rattus rattus (Black rat)
- Sciurus aureogaster (Mexican gray squirrel)
- Sus scrofa (Wild boar)
- Vulpes vulpes (Red fox)

=== Birds ===
- Alopochen aegyptiaca (Egyptian goose)
- Cairina moschata (Muscovy duck)
- Columba livia domestica (Feral pigeon)
- Passer domesticus (House sparrow)
- Pavo cristatus (Indian peafowl)
- Sturnus vulgaris (European starling)

=== Reptiles ===
- Agama picticauda (Peter's rock agama)
- Anolis equestris (Knight anole)
- Anolis sagrei (Brown anole)
- Boa constrictor (Boa constrictor)
- Caiman crocodilus (Spectacled caiman)
- Chamaeleo calyptratus (Veiled chameleon)
- Ctenosaura pectinata (Western spiny-tailed iguana)
- Ctenosaura similis (Black spiny-tailed iguana)
- Eunectes murinus (Green anaconda)
- Eunectes notaeus (Yellow anaconda)
- Furcifer oustaleti (Malagasy giant chameleon)
- Furcifer pardalis (Panther chameleon)
- Gekko gecko (Tokay gecko)
- Hemidactylus frenatus (Common house gecko)
- Hemidactylus turcicus (Mediterranean gecko)
- Iguana iguana (Green iguana)
- Malayopython reticulatus (Reticulated python)
- Phelsuma grandis (Madagascar giant day gecko)
- Python bivittatus (Burmese python); see main article, Burmese pythons in Florida
- Python molurus (Indian python): Inter-species hybridization with the Burmese python.
- Python sebae (African rock python)
- Salvator merianae (Argentine black and white tegu)
- Trachemys scripta elegans (Red-eared slider)
- Varanus niloticus (Nile monitor)

=== Amphibians ===
- Eleutherodactylus coqui (Common coquí)
- Eleutherodactylus planirostris (Greenhouse frog)
- Osteopilus septentrionalis (Cuban tree frog)
- Rhinella marina (Cane toad)

=== Fish ===
- Acanthogobius flavimanus (Yellowfin goby)
- Amphilophus citrinellus (Midas cichlid)
- Astronotus ocellatus (Oscar)
- Belonesox belizanus (Pike killifish)
- Channa aurolineata (Goldline snakehead)
- Chitala ornata (Clown featherback)
- Cichla ocellaris (Butterfly peacock bass)
- Cichlasoma bimaculatum (Black acara)
- Clarias batrachus (Walking catfish)
- Ctenopharyngodon idella (Grass carp)
- Cyprinus carpio (Eurasian carp)
- Hemichromis letourneuxi (African jewelfish)
- Herichthys cyanoguttatus (Texas cichlid)
- Heros severus (Banded cichlid)
- Heterotilapia buttikoferi (Zebra tilapia)
- Hoplosternum littorale (Brown hoplo)
- Hypostomus plecostomus (Suckermouth catfish)
- Ictalurus furcatus (Blue catfish)
- Mayaheros urophthalmus (Mayan cichlid)
- Monopterus albus (Asian swamp eel)
- Oreochromis aureus (Blue tilapia)
- Oreochromis mossambicus (Mozambique tilapia)
- Oreochromis niloticus (Nile tilapia)
- Parachromis managuensis (Jaguar cichlid)
- Pterois miles (Common lionfish)
- Pterois volitans (Red lionfish)
- Pelmatolapia mariae (Spotted tilapia)
- Pterygoplichthys disjunctivus (Vermiculated sailfin catfish)
- Pterygoplichthys multiradiatus (Orinoco sailfin catfish)
- Pterygoplichthys pardalis (Amazon sailfin catfish)
- Pylodictis olivaris (Flathead catfish)
- Sarotherodon melanotheron (Blackchin tilapia)

=== Invertebrates ===
- Aedes albopictus (Asian tiger mosquito)
- Aethina tumida (Small hive beetle)
- Amynthas agrestis (Crazy worm)
- Anastrepha suspensa (Caribbean fruit fly)
- Aphis spiraecola (Spirea aphid)
- Apis mellifera scutellata (African bee)
- Aulacaspis yasumatsui (Cycad aulacaspis scale)
- Bugula neritina (Brown bryozoan)
- Cactoblastis cactorum (Cactus moth)
- Cerataphis lataniae (Palm aphid)
- Cnestus mutilatus (Camphor shot borer)
- Coptotermes formosanus (Formosan subterranean termite)
- Coptotermes gestroi (Asian subterranean termite)
- Corbicula fluminea (Asian clam)
- Cordylophora caspia (Euryhaline hydroid)
- Cryptotermes brevis (Powderpost termite)
- Culex quinquefasciatus (Southern house mosquito)
- Dinoderus minutus (Bamboo borer)
- Euglossa dilemma (green orchid bee)
- Glycaspis brimblecombei (Red gum lerp psyllid)
- Harmonia axyridis (Harlequin ladybird)
- Heterotermes cardini (West Indian subterranean termite)
- Hypogeococcus pungens (Cactus mealybug)
- Icerya purchasi (Cottony cushion scale)
- Incisitermes minor (Western drywood termite)
- Leptocybe invasa (Blue gum chalcid wasp)
- Linepithema humile (Argentine ant)
- Lissachatina fulica (African giant land snail)
- Maconellicoccus hirsutus (Pink hibiscus mealybug)
- Marisa cornuarietis (Colombian ramshorn apple snail)
- Melanoides tuberculata (Red-rimmed melania)
- Metamasius callizona (Mexican bromeliad weevil)
- Nasutitermes corniger (Conehead termite)
- Opogona sacchari (Banana moth)
- Paratachardina pseudolobata (Lobate lac scale)
- Pheidole megacephala (Big-headed ant)
- Phenacoccus solenopsis (Cotton mealybug)
- Platydemus manokwari (New Guinea flatworm)
- Pomacea maculata (island applesnail)
- Polyandrocarpa zorritensis
- Raoiella indica (Red palm mite)
- Solenopsis invicta (Red imported fire ant)
- Tapinoma melanocephalum (Ghost ant)
- Trichomyrmex destructor (Singapore ant)
- Tubastraea coccinea (Orange cup coral)
- Wasmannia auropunctata (Electric ant)
- Xanthogaleruca luteola (Elm leaf beetle)
- Xyleborinus saxesenii (Fruit-tree pinhole borer)
- Xylosandrus compactus (Black twig borer)
- Xylosandrus crassiusculus (Asian ambrosia beetle)
- Zachrysia provisoria (Cuban brown snail)

== Plants ==
The non-governmental organization FISC published the following list of invasive plant species in 2025.

FISC added three category II species to the list in the 2025 update.

In 2023, three species were added to Category I, and Category II included four additional species.

The watch list from FISC highlights species of concern which are not yet included in the Category I or II lists.

The FISC list is a recommendation for natural resource managers, environmental education, and volunteer removal, but is not regulatory by law. State regulated plant species are listed in the State of Florida Noxious Weed List, and the State of Florida Prohibited Aquatic Plants List. Many of the non-native plant species documented in Florida are assessed for invasive potential by UF/IFAS.

FISC describes Category I species as plants which displace native species, disrupt ecological functions, or hybridize with native species. Category II species have not yet altered Florida plant communities to the extent shown by Category I species, but may be assigned to Category I if enough negative impact is reported.

=== Category I ===
- Abrus precatorius
- Acacia auriculiformis
- Albizia julibrissin
- Albizia lebbeck
- Ardisia crenata
- Ardisia elliptica
- Asparagus aethiopicus
- Bauhinia variegata
- Bischofia javanica
- Calophyllum antillanum
- Casuarina equisetifolia
- Casuarina glauca
- Cenchrus purpureus (Pennisetum purpureum)
- Cinnamomum camphora
- Colocasia esculenta
- Colubrina asiatica
- Cupaniopsis anacardioides
- Cyperus blepharoleptos*
- Deparia petersenii
- Dioscorea alata
- Dioscorea bulbifera
- Dolichandra unguis-cati (Macfadyena unguis-cati)
- Eichhornia crassipes
- Eugenia uniflora
- Ficus microcarpa
- Heptapleurum actinophyllum
- Hydrilla verticillata
- Hygrophila polysperma
- Hymenachne amplexicaulis
- Imperata cylindrica
- Ipomoea aquatica
- Jasminum dichotomum
- Jasminum fluminense
- Lantana strigocamara (traditionally misidentified as L. camara)
- Ligustrum lucidum
- Ligustrum sinense
- Lonicera japonica
- Ludwigia peruviana
- Lumnitzera racemosa
- Luziola subintegra
- Lygodium japonicum
- Lygodium microphyllum
- Manilkara zapota
- Melaleuca quinquenervia
- Melinis repens (Rhynchelytrum repens)
- Microsorum grossum (previously misidentified as M. scolopendria)
- Microstegium vimineum
- Mimosa pigra
- Nandina domestica
- Nephrolepis brownii
- Nephrolepis cordifolia
- Neyraudia reynaudiana
- Nymphoides cristata
- Paederia cruddasiana
- Paederia foetida
- Panicum repens
- Pistia stratiotes (likely a native cryptogenic species)
- Psidium cattleianum
- Psidium guajava
- Pueraria montana var. lobata (P. lobata)
- Rhodomyrtus tomentosa
- Ruellia simplex (R. brittoniana, R. tweediana, R. caerulea, R. simplex)
- Salvinia minima
- Scaevola taccada
- Schinus terebinthifolius
- Scleria eggersiana*
- Scleria lacustris
- Scleria microcarpa
- Senna pendula var. glabrata
- Solanum tampicense
- Solanum viarum
- Sporobolus jacquemontii
- Syngonium podophyllum
- Syzygium cumini
- Tectaria incisa
- Thelypteris opulenta
- Thespesia populnea
- Tradescantia fluminensis
- Tradescantia spathacea*
- Triadica sebifera (Sapium sebiferum)
- Urena lobata
- Vitex rotundifolia

=== Category II ===
- Adenanthera pavonina
- Agave sisalana
- Alstonia macrophylla
- Alternanthera philoxeroides
- Antigonon leptopus
- Ardisia japonica
- Aristolochia elegans (Aristolochia littoralis)
- Asclepias curassavica†
- Asystasia gangetica
- Begonia cucullata
- Broussonetia papyrifera
- Bruguiera gynnorhiza
- Callisia fragrans
- Casuarina cunninghamiana
- Cecropia palmata
- Cenchrus polystachios (Pennisetum polystachion)
- Cenchrus setaceus (Pennisetum setaceum)
- Cestrum diurnum
- Chamaedorea seifrizii
- Clematis terniflora
- Cocos nucifera
- Crassocephalum crepidioides
- Cryptostegia madagascariensis
- Cyperus involucratus
- Cyperus prolifer
- Dactyloctenium aegyptium
- Dalbergia sissoo
- Dalechampia scandens
- Distimake tuberosus (Merremia tuberosa)
- Dracaena hyacinthoides (Sansevieria hyacinthoides)
- Elaeagnus pungens
- Elaeagnus umbellata
- Epipremnum pinnatum
- Eulophia graminea
- Ficus altissima
- Flacourtia indica
- Hemarthria altissima
- Heteropterys brachiata
- Hyparrhenia rufa
- Ipomoea carnea subsp. fistulosa
- Kalanchoe pinnata
- Kalanchoe x houghtonii
- Koelreuteria elegans subsp. formosana
- Landoltia punctata (Spirodela punctata)
- Leucaena leucocephala
- Limnophila sessiliflora
- Livistona chinensis
- Macroptilium lathyroides
- Melaleuca viminalis (Callistemon viminalis)
- Melia azedarach
- Melinis minutiflora
- Mikania micrantha
- Momordica charantia
- Murraya paniculata
- Myriophyllum spicatum
- Noronhia emarginata†
- Passiflora biflora
- Phoenix reclinata
- Phyllostachys aurea
- Pittosporum pentandrum
- Platycerium bifurcatum
- Praxelis clematidea
- Pteris tripartita*
- Pteris vittata
- Ptychosperma elegans
- Richardia grandiflora
- Ricinus communis
- Rotala rotundifolia
- Ruellia blechum
- Selenicereus pteranthus*
- Sesbania punicea
- Sida planicaulis
- Solanum diphyllum
- Solanum torvum
- Spermacoce verticillata (does not include the native endemic Spermacoce neoterminalis)
- Sphagneticola trilobata (Wedelia triloba)
- Stachytarpheta cayennensis (produces a hybrid with the Florida native species Stachytarpheta jamaicensis known as Stachytarpheta x intercedens)
- Syagrus romanzoffiana
- Syzygium jambos
- Tabebuia heterophylla*
- Talipariti tiliaceum var. tiliaceum
- Terminalia catappa
- Terminalia muelleri
- Thelypteris dentata (Christella dentata)
- Tradescantia zebrina†
- Tribulus cistoides
- Urochloa maxima (Panicum maximum)
- Vernicia fordii
- Vitex trifolia
- Washingtonia robusta
- Wisteria sinensis
- Xanthosoma sagittifolium

*Species added in 2023

†Species added in 2025

== See also ==
- List of amphibians of Florida
- List of birds of Florida
- List of mammals of Florida
- List of reptiles of Florida
- List of snakes of Florida
- List of genetic hybrids
- Invasive species in the United States
- List of invasive species in the Everglades
- Fauna of Florida
- Chameleon ranching
