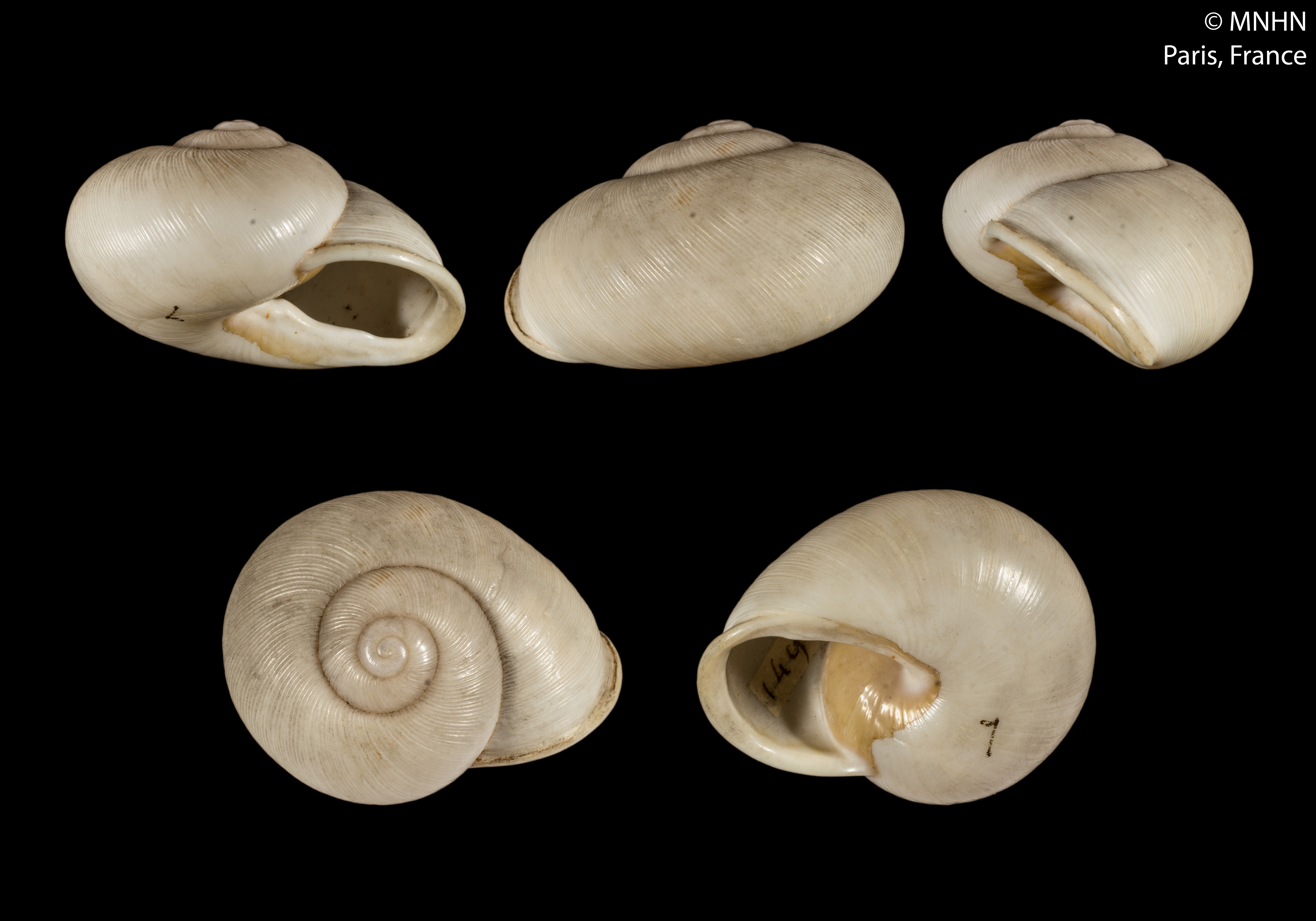
- Apical view of the shell of Zachrysia auricoma, from the National Museum of Natural History, France

Conservation status
- Secure (NatureServe)

Scientific classification
- Kingdom: Animalia
- Phylum: Mollusca
- Class: Gastropoda
- Order: Stylommatophora
- Family: Zachrysiidae
- Genus: Zachrysia
- Species: Z. auricoma

Binomial name
- Zachrysia auricoma (Férussac, 1821)

Synonyms
- Helix (Helicogena) auricoma Férussac, 1821; Helix auricoma Férussac, 1821; Helix noscibilis Férussac, 1832; Pleurodonte auricoma (Férussac, 1821); Zachrysia (Chrysias) noscibilis (Férussac, 1832); Zachrysia (Zachrysia) auricoma (Férussac, 1821); Zachrysia noscibilis (Férussac, 1832)

= Zachrysia auricoma =

Species of mollusc

Zachrysia auricoma is a species of air-breathing land snail, terrestrial pulmonate gastropod molluscs in the family Zachrysiidae.

== Distribution ==
This terrestrial snail occurs in Cuba.

This species has not yet become established in the USA, but it is considered to represent a potentially serious threat as a pest, an invasive species which could negatively affect agriculture, natural ecosystems, human health or commerce. Therefore it has been suggested that this species be given top national quarantine significance in the USA.
