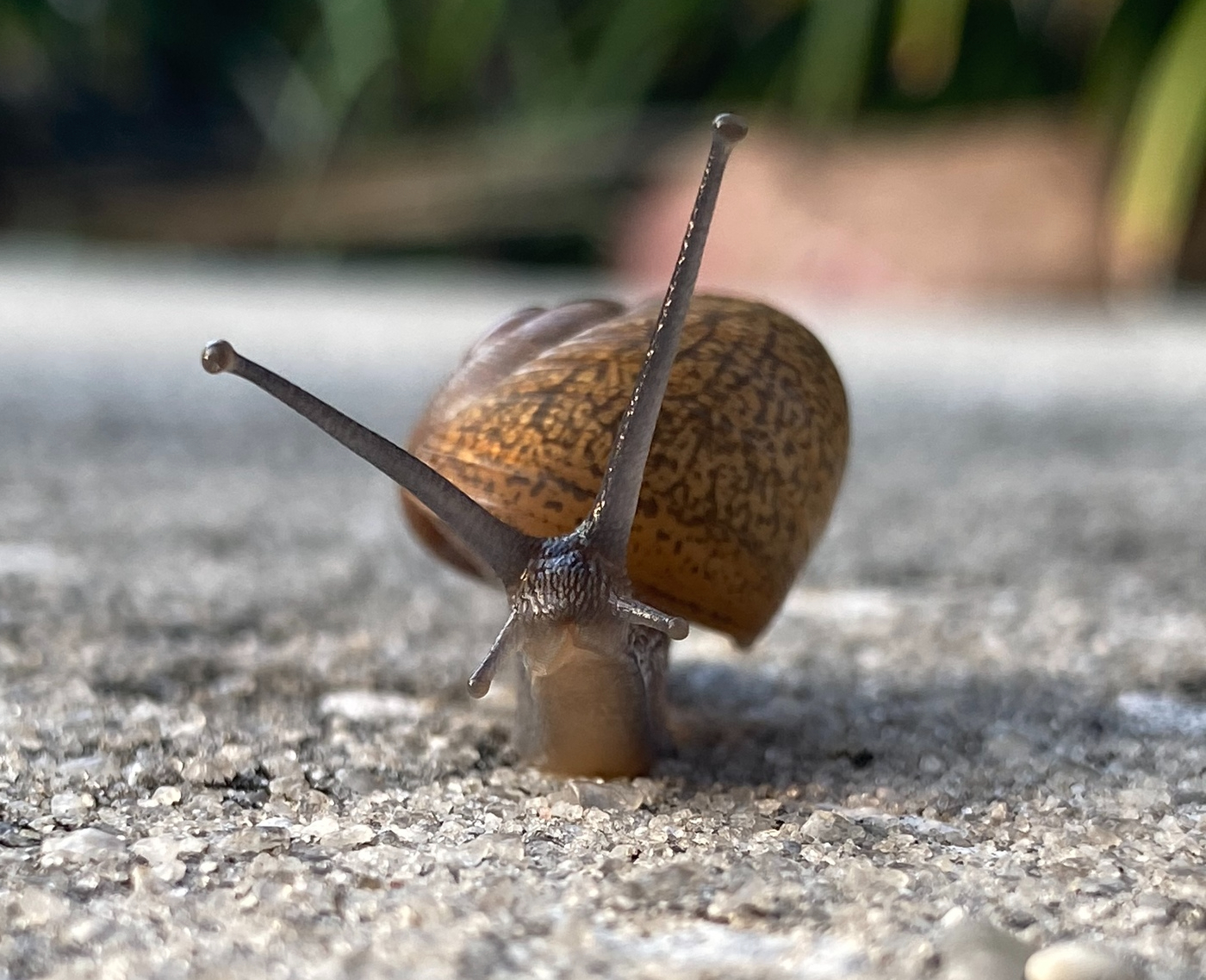
- Zachrysia provisoria in Indian Rocks Beach, Florida

Conservation status
- Secure (NatureServe)

Scientific classification
- Kingdom: Animalia
- Phylum: Mollusca
- Class: Gastropoda
- Order: Stylommatophora
- Family: Zachrysiidae
- Genus: Zachrysia
- Species: Z. provisoria

Binomial name
- Zachrysia provisoria (Pfeiffer, 1858)

Synonyms
- Helix provisoria Pfeiffer, 1858; Pleurodonte (Zachrysia) provisoria (Pfeiffer, 1858); Pleurodonte auricoma provisoria (Pfeiffer, 1858); Zachrysia (Chrysias) provisoria (Pfeiffer, 1858)

= Zachrysia provisoria =

Species of gastropod

Zachrysia provisoria, the Cuban brown snail, is a species of air-breathing land snail, a terrestrial pulmonate gastropod mollusc in the family Zachrysiidae.

This species is already established in the US and is considered a potentially serious threat as a pest or invasive species which could negatively affect agriculture, natural ecosystems, human health or commerce. Therefore, it has been suggested that this species be given top national quarantine significance in the US.

== Description ==
The shell is medium-sized (25–30 mm width), globose in shape with 4 to 5 whorls. The spire is not very pointed. The apertural lip, or the lip of the shell at its opening, is thick and slightly reflected, or tilting upwards.

The shell is generally very smooth, clean, and even shiny. Typically, the shell is a rich, dark tan and may have light brown streaks. Older shells may fade to a yellowish brown. The mantle is speckled black and can be seen if the shell is translucent.

A very similar species of snail is Zachrysia trinitaria (Pfeiffer). Adults of Z. trinitaria can be distinguished from Z. provisoria by their large size, since they are 1.5 to 2.0 times bigger than Z. provisoria.

== Distribution ==
The native distribution of the snail is Cuba. Along with others in its subgenus, the snail is believed to be found in eastern and central Cuba, especially in the Granma Province.

However, the current distribution of Z. provisoria includes:

- Anguilla
- Antigua
- Bahamas
- Barbados
- Cayman Islands
- Cuba
- Dominican Republic
- Florida (Brevard, Orange, Broward, Collier, Lee, Miami-Dade, Hillsborough, Monroe, Palm Beach and Pinellas counties)
- Guadeloupe.
- Jamaica
- Mustique
- Nevis
- Puerto Rico
- Saint-Bathelemy.
- Saint-Lucia.
- Saint-Martin/Sint Maarten.
- U.S. Virgin Islands

== Habitat ==
This species lives among leaf litter and among ornamental plants. In its native habitat it is usually found in shady ravines, near leaf litter, shrubby areas, and hiding around rocks. The snail prefers tropical climates, but can tolerate cool, dry winters. The snail will live in forested areas and even mountainous regions, provided there is a high level of moisture.

Like other terrestrial snails Z. provisoria may use love-darts while mating.

== Feeding habits ==
Zachrysia provisoria is a polyphagous snail attacking a wide range of agricultural and horticultural plants. Known host plants include Bougainvillea, various citrus species, crepe myrtle, mango and star fruit (carambola). The snails can rasp the bark and epiderm of cuttings of several plants.

This snail is often exported by accident from Florida to other areas and poses a quarantine problem for Florida.
