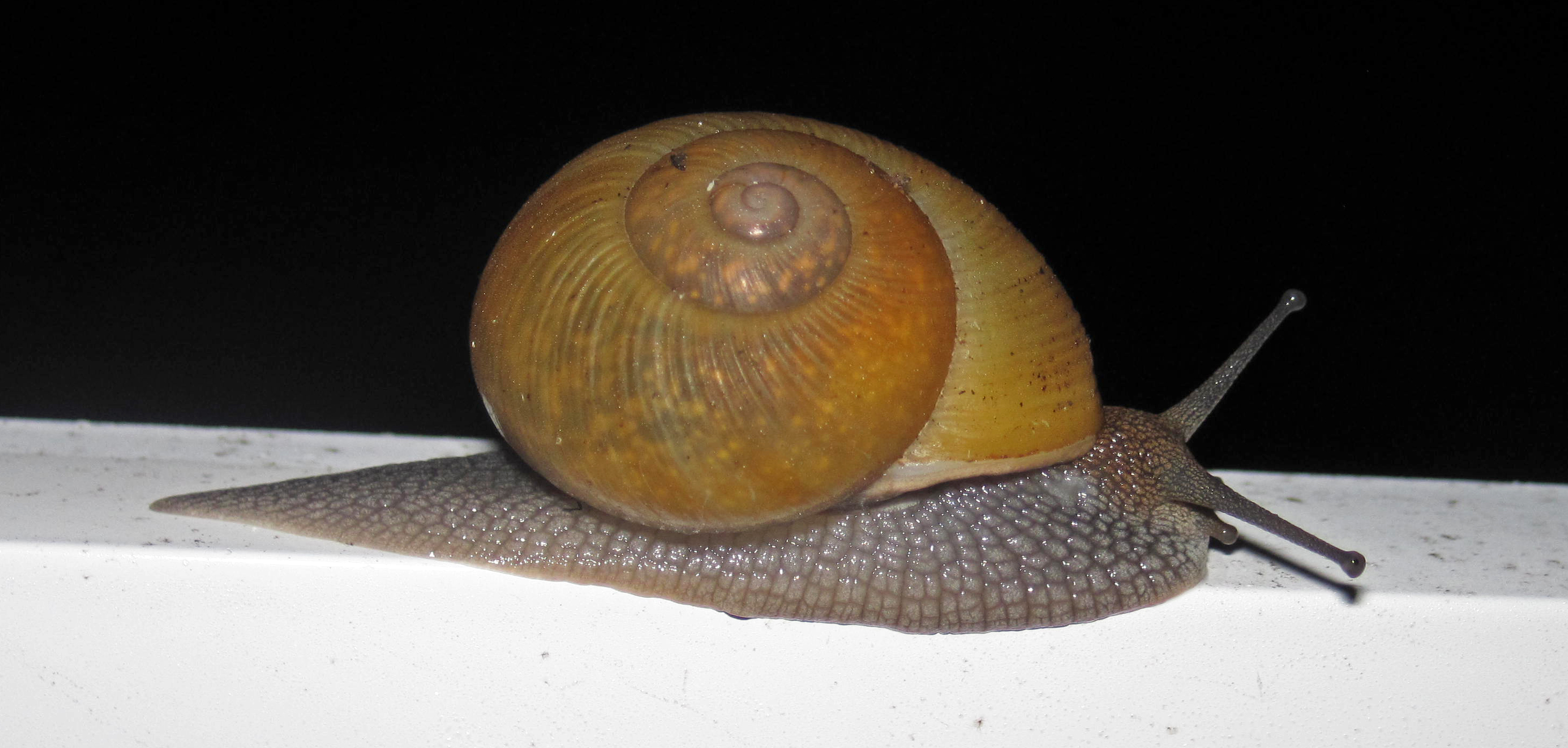
- A live Zachrysia trinitaria.
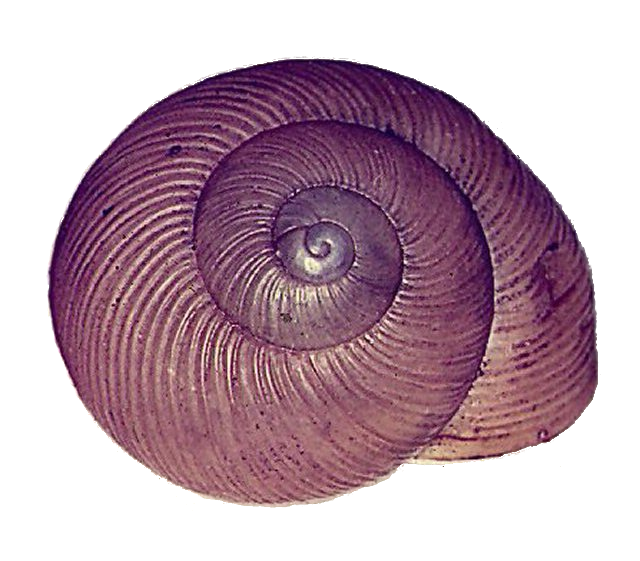
- Apical view of a shell of Zachrysia provisoria

Scientific classification
- Kingdom: Animalia
- Phylum: Mollusca
- Class: Gastropoda
- Order: Stylommatophora
- Suborder: Helicina
- Superfamily: Sagdoidea
- Family: Zachrysiidae
- Genus: Zachrysia; Pilsbry, 1926

Type species
- Helix (Helicogena) auricoma Férussac, 1821

Synonyms
- Pleurodonte (Zachrysia) Pilsbry, 1894; Zachrysia (Auritesta) Pilsbry, 1929· accepted, alternate representation; Zachrysia (Chrysias) Pilsbry, 1929· accepted, alternate representation; Zachrysia (Megachrysia) Pilsbry, 1929· accepted, alternate representation; Zachrysia (Torrechrysias) Bonilla, 1936· accepted, alternate representation; Zachrysia (Zachrysia) Pilsbry, 1894· accepted, alternate representation

= Zachrysia =

Genus of gastropods

Zachrysia is a genus of air-breathing land snails, terrestrial pulmonate gastropod molluscs in the family Zachrysiidae.

== Species ==
Species within the genus Zachrysia are majorly Cuban endemics and include:

- Zachrysia auricoma (Férussac, 1821)
- Zachrysia baracoensis (Gutiérrez in Pfeiffer, 1858)
- Zachrysia bayamensis (L. Pfeiffer, 1854)
- Zachrysia emarginata (Gundlach in Pfeiffer,. 1859)
- Zachrysia flavicoma Pilsbry, 1929
- † Zachrysia fraterna Ross, 1988
- Zachrysia gibarana Pilsbry, 1929
- Zachrysia guanensis (Poey, 1857)
- Zachrysia guantanamensis (Poey, 1857)
- Zachrysia gundlachiana Pilsbry, 1929
- Zachrysia petitiana (d'Orbigny, 1842)
- Zachrysia proboscidea (L. Pfeiffer, 1856)
- Zachrysia provisoria (Pfeiffer, 1858)
- Zachrysia rangeliana (Pfeiffer, 1854)
- Zachrysia scabrosa (Poey, 1854)
- Zachrysia torrei (Henderson, 1916)
- Zachrysia trinitaria (L. Pfeiffer, 1858)
