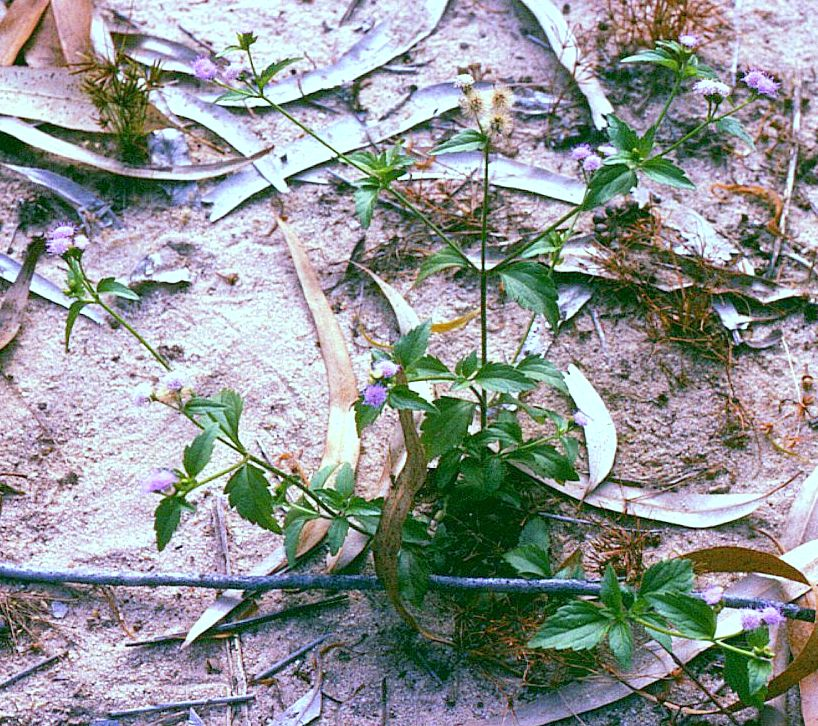
- Praxelis clematidea

Scientific classification
- Kingdom: Plantae
- Clade: Tracheophytes
- Clade: Angiosperms
- Clade: Eudicots
- Clade: Asterids
- Order: Asterales
- Family: Asteraceae
- Subfamily: Asteroideae
- Tribe: Eupatorieae
- Genus: Praxelis; Cass.

Synonyms
- Eupatorium sect. Praxelis (Cass.) Benth. ex Baker; Bembicium Mart. ex Baker; Ooclinium DC.

= Praxelis =

Genus of plants

Praxelis is a genus of flowering plants in the tribe Eupatorieae within the family Asteraceae.

Species

- Praxelis asperulacea - Brazil, Bolivia, Venezuela, Guyana
- Praxelis basifolia - Brazil
- Praxelis capillaris - Brazil
- Praxelis chiquitensis - Bolivia
- Praxelis clematidea - Brazil, Bolivia, Paraguay, Peru; naturalized in China, Florida, and Australia
- Praxelis conoclinanthia - Bolivia
- Praxelis diffusa - Bolivia, Peru, Colombia, Venezuela, Guyana, Suriname, Fr Guinea
- Praxelis grandiflora - Brazil
- Praxelis insignia - Brazil
- Praxelis karuaiensis - Venezuela
- Praxelis kleinioides - Brazil, Bolivia, Peru, Venezuela, Colombia
- Praxelis missiona - Brazil, Argentina
- Praxelis odontodactyla - São Paulo
- Praxelis ostenii - Brazil, Paraguay
- Praxelis pauciflora - Brazil, Venezuela, Colombia, Peru, Guyana
- Praxelis splettii - Goiás
