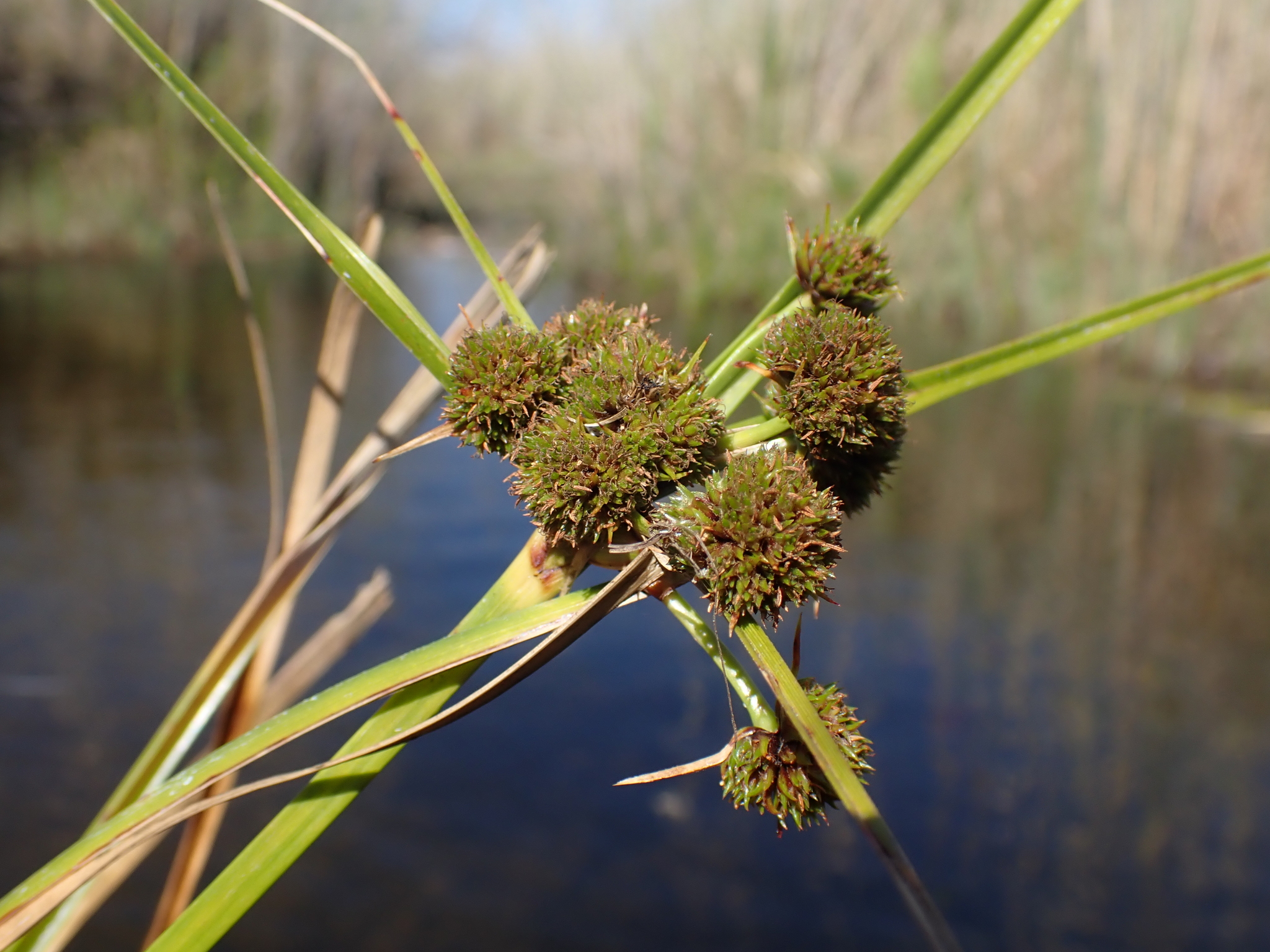

Scientific classification
- Kingdom: Plantae
- Clade: Tracheophytes
- Clade: Angiosperms
- Clade: Monocots
- Clade: Commelinids
- Order: Poales
- Family: Cyperaceae
- Genus: Cyperus
- Species: C. blepharoleptos

Binomial name
- Cyperus blepharoleptos Steud

Synonyms
- Oxycaryum cubense; Scirpus cubensis; Anosporum cubense

= Cyperus blepharoleptos =

Species of plant in the sedge family

Cyperus blepharoleptos is a sedge of the family Cyperaceae that is native to the Americas, Caribbean Islands, and Africa. A common name for this species is Cuban bulrush.

This species of Cyperus was named by German physician and amateur botanist, Ernst Gottlieb von Steudel, in 1854.

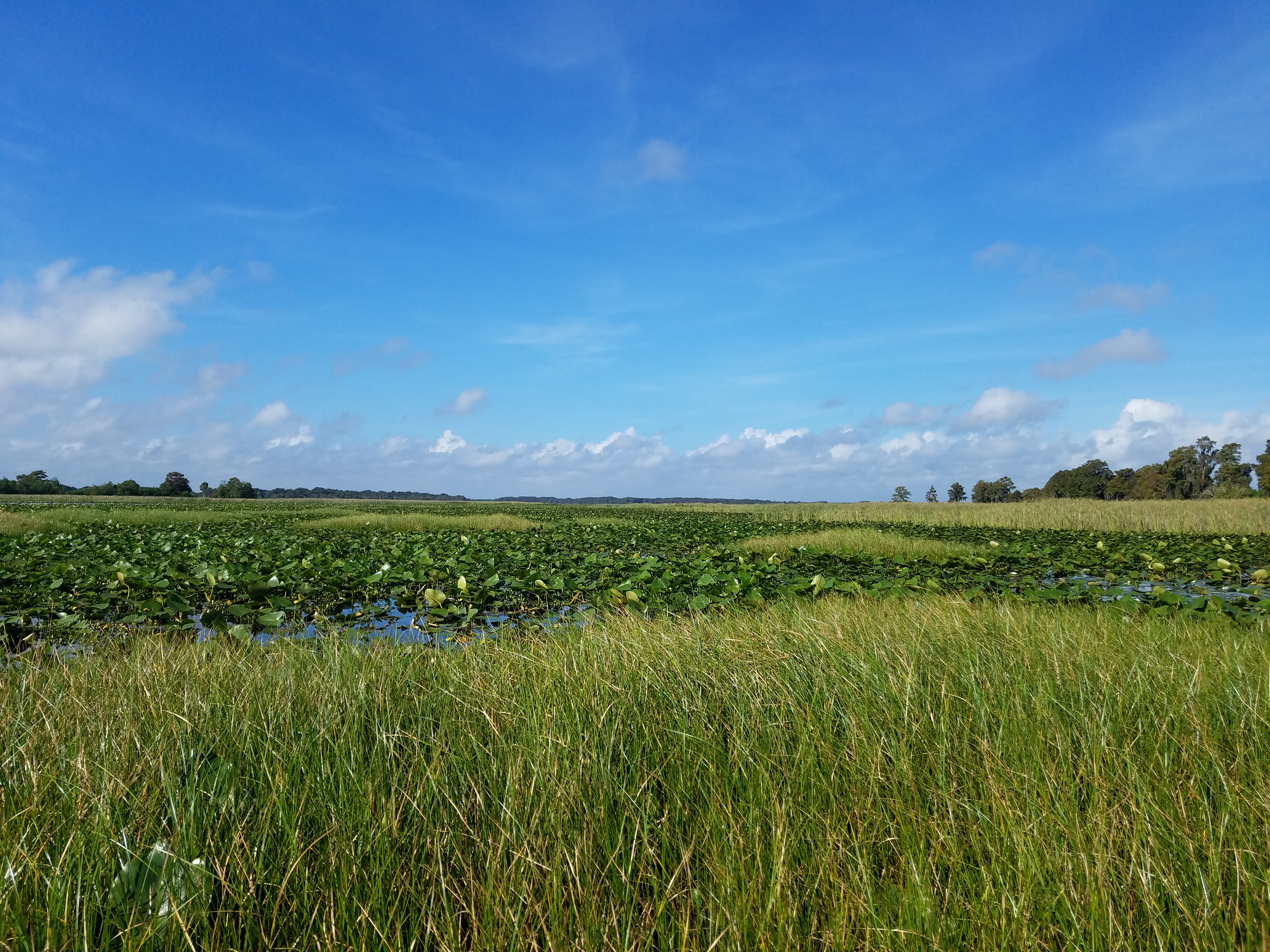
Cuban bulrush growing in Lake Toho, Florida

It grows to a height of 0.30–0.91 m (1–3 ft). Its stems are sharply triangular and smooth and the leaves grow from the base of the plant. The leaves are narrow and ribbon-like; 6.4 mm (0.25 in) wide and 0.91–1.22 m (3–4 ft) in length, with the leaves often longer than the stem. The inflorescence occurs at the top of the stem. Each stalk is topped by a dense, spherical head, about 19 mm (0.75 in) in diameter. The heads containing numerous reddish-brown spikelets, which are spiral and overlapping. The fruit is an olive nutlet about 20 mm (0.8 in) in length.

== See also ==
- List of Cyperus species
