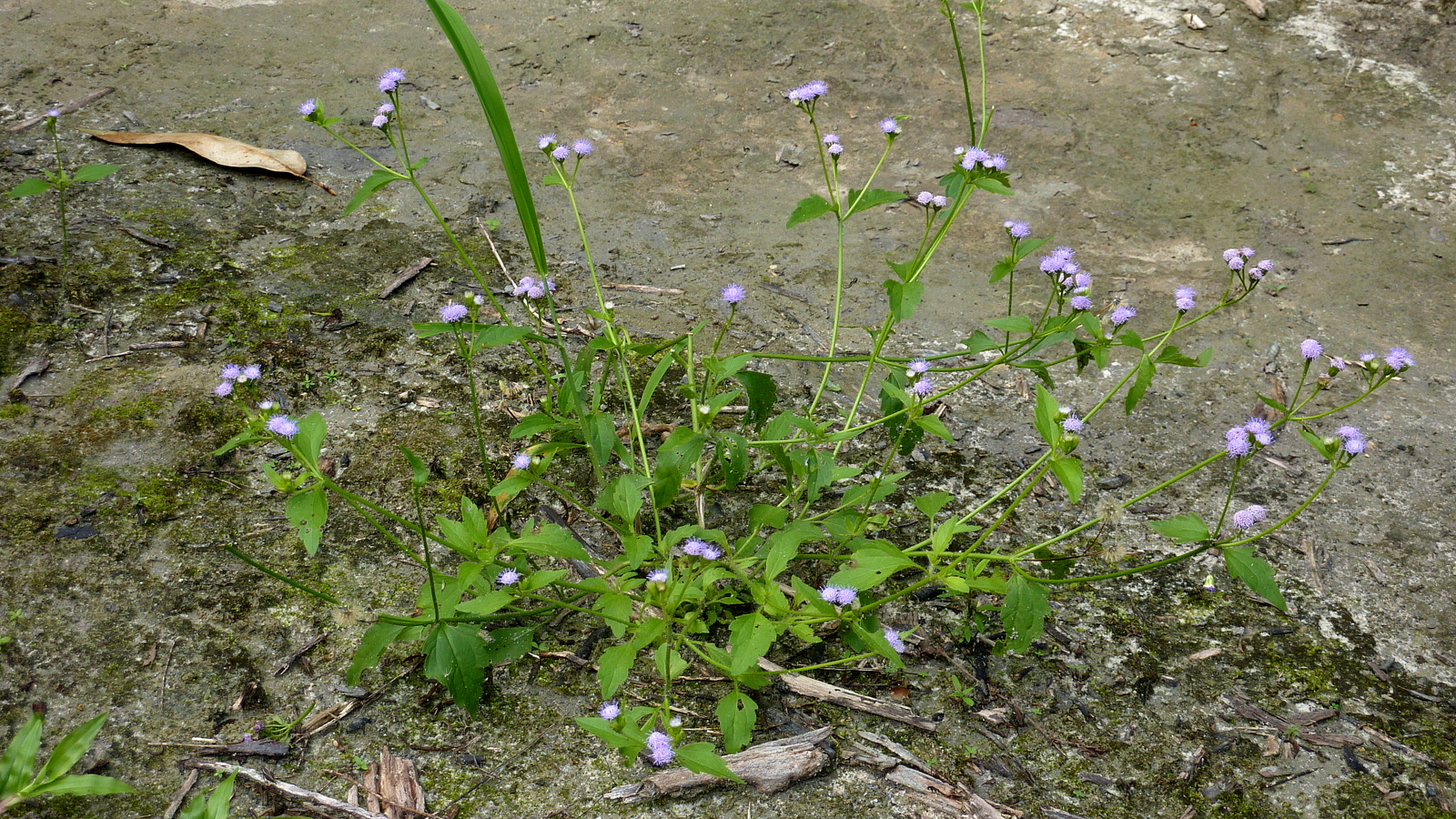

Scientific classification
- Kingdom: Plantae
- Clade: Tracheophytes
- Clade: Angiosperms
- Clade: Eudicots
- Clade: Asterids
- Order: Asterales
- Family: Asteraceae
- Genus: Praxelis
- Species: P. clematidea

Binomial name
- Praxelis clematidea (Hieron. ex Kuntze) R.M.King & H.Rob.

= Praxelis clematidea =

Species of flowering plant

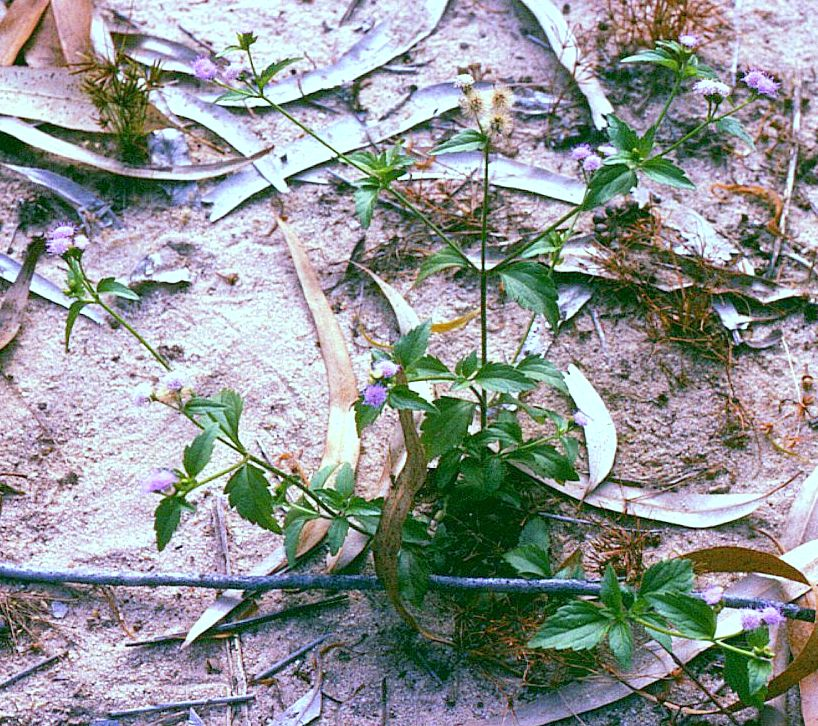

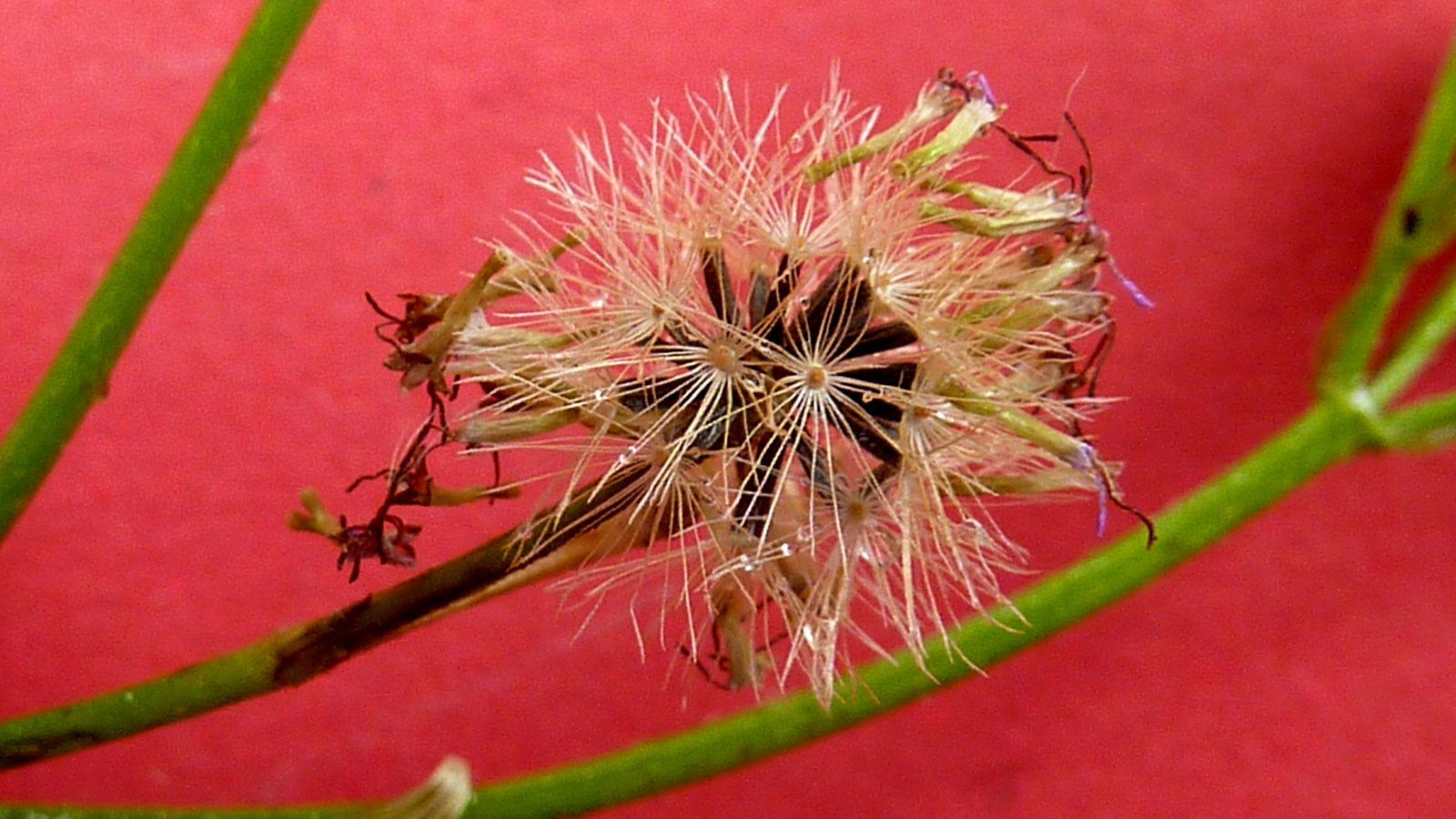

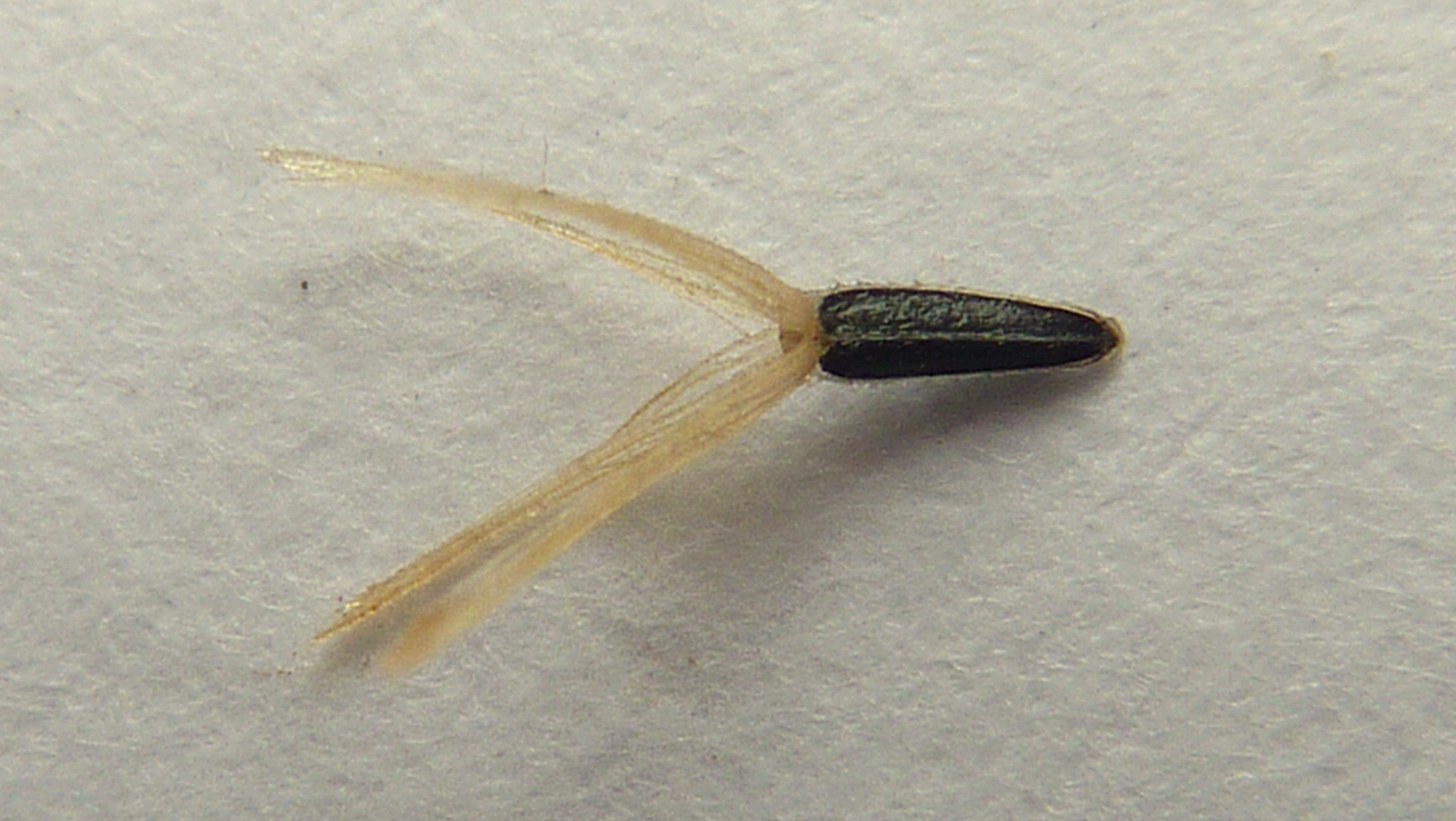

Praxelis clematidea is a flowering plant from South America. It is considered an invasive weed in Florida. It is an annual plant.

It is in the family Asteraceae. It is easily confused with Ageratum houstonianum (bluemink) and Conoclinium coelestinum (blue mistflower).
