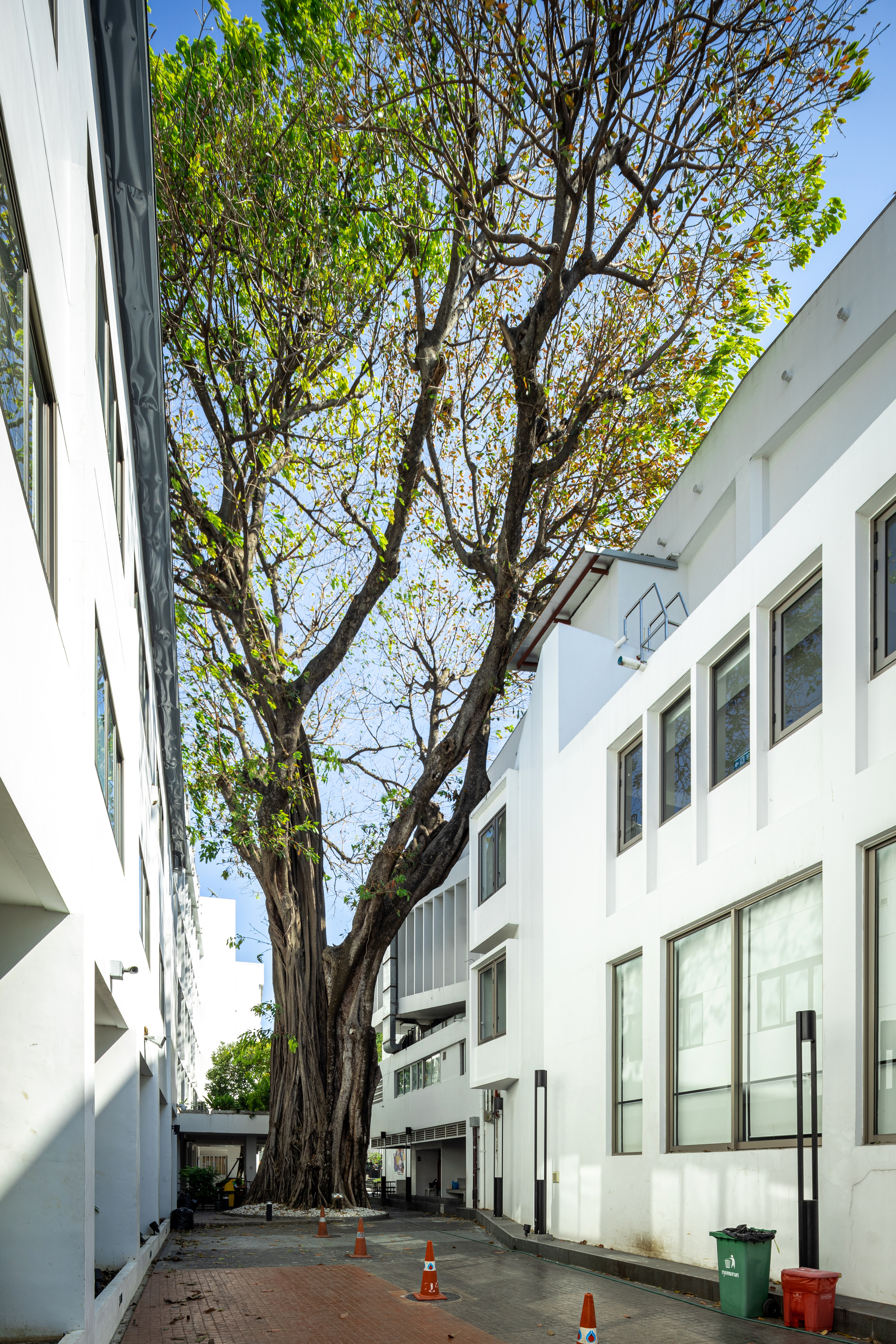
- Ficus altissima at Silpakorn University in 2023

Conservation status
- Least Concern (IUCN 3.1)

Scientific classification
- Kingdom: Plantae
- Clade: Tracheophytes
- Clade: Angiosperms
- Clade: Eudicots
- Clade: Rosids
- Order: Rosales
- Family: Moraceae
- Genus: Ficus
- Subgenus: F. subg. Urostigma
- Species: F. altissima

Binomial name
- Ficus altissima Blume (1826)

Synonyms
- Ficus altissima var. laccifera (Roxb.) Prain; Ficus altissima f. laccifera (Roxb.) King; Ficus laccifera Roxb.; Ficus latifolia Oken, nom. illeg. homonym. post.; Urostigma altissimum Miq.; Urostigma lacciferum Miq.

= Ficus altissima =

Species of fig

Ficus altissima, commonly known as the council tree and lofty fig, is a species of flowering plant, a fig tree in the family Moraceae. It is a large, stately evergreen hemiepiphyte and is native to southeastern Asia.

== Description ==
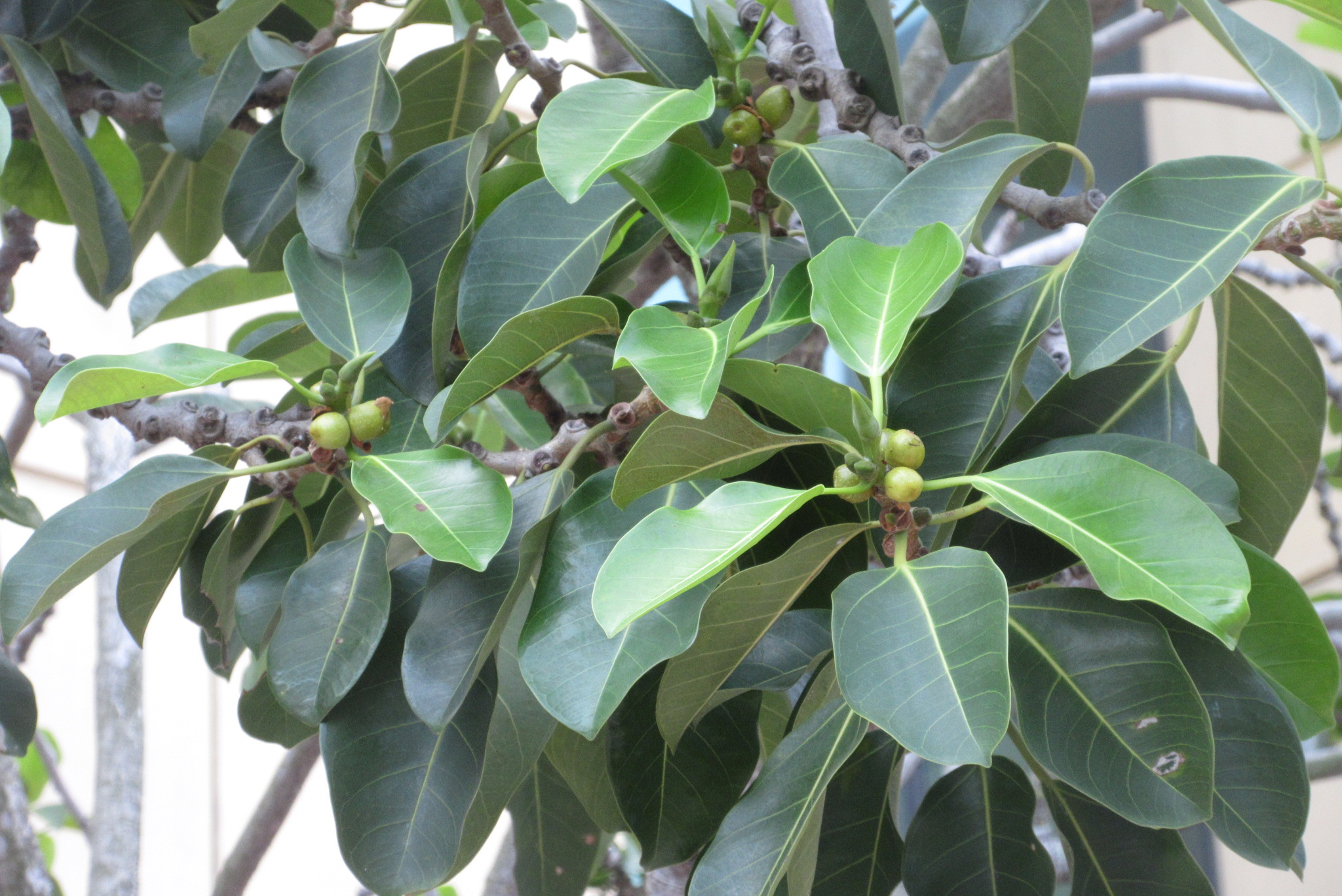
Leaves

Ficus altissima is a large, evergreen forest tree, growing to 30 m (98 ft), with a spreading crown and often multiple buttressed trunks and characteristic of its subgenus Urostigma. The bark is smooth and grey, with small pale brown pustules. The branches are spreading and the twigs are hairy and often green when young. The leaves are alternate, elliptic to ovate, with entire margins and up to 100 by 40 mm (3.9 by 1.6 in). They are supported on short stalks and have sheathing stipules.

The flowers are solitary or in pairs and are in the axils of the leaves. They are concealed inside hollow receptacles which grow into orangish-red, many-seeded. 25 mm (1 in) figs following pollination.

== Distribution and habitat ==
Ficus altissima is native to southeastern Asia and many islands in the Pacific. Its range includes the Andaman Islands, Myanmar, Thailand, Vietnam, Laos, South China and the Malesia region. It was first described by the Dutch botanist Carl Ludwig Blume in 1826 from Java. It has become naturalized in some of the southern counties of Florida. It grows in mountains and plains.

=== Common Names ===
Vernacular names include:

- Chinese: 高山榕 gao shan rong
- Vietnamese: đa tía (sometimes đa rất cao: i.e. "very tall")
- Myanmar; "Nyaung Moat Seit"

== Ecology ==
Ficus altissima is a "strangler fig", often starting life as an epiphyte, on trees such as Lagerstroemia (as illustrated above) or palms, sending down roots to the ground which in time grow stout enough to support the growing tree independently. By this time the host tree has been overwhelmed and killed. It can also grow as a lithophyte in a crevice in a rock or a man made structure. It is sometimes planted as a shade tree but has a wide root system and is unsuitably large for most urban areas.

Ficus altissima is one of many trees that hosts lac insects, scale insects in the superfamily Coccoidea, from which the dye lac is obtained. It has been planted in southern Florida, where it didn't seed because there weren't any native insects available to pollinate the flowers. However, non-native wasps (Eupristina sp.), that have become established in the area, seem capable of pollinating it and the tree is now proliferating and becoming invasive.

== Cultivation ==
A cultivar 'Yellow Gem' is a variegated variety with yellow tinted leaves.

== Gallery ==
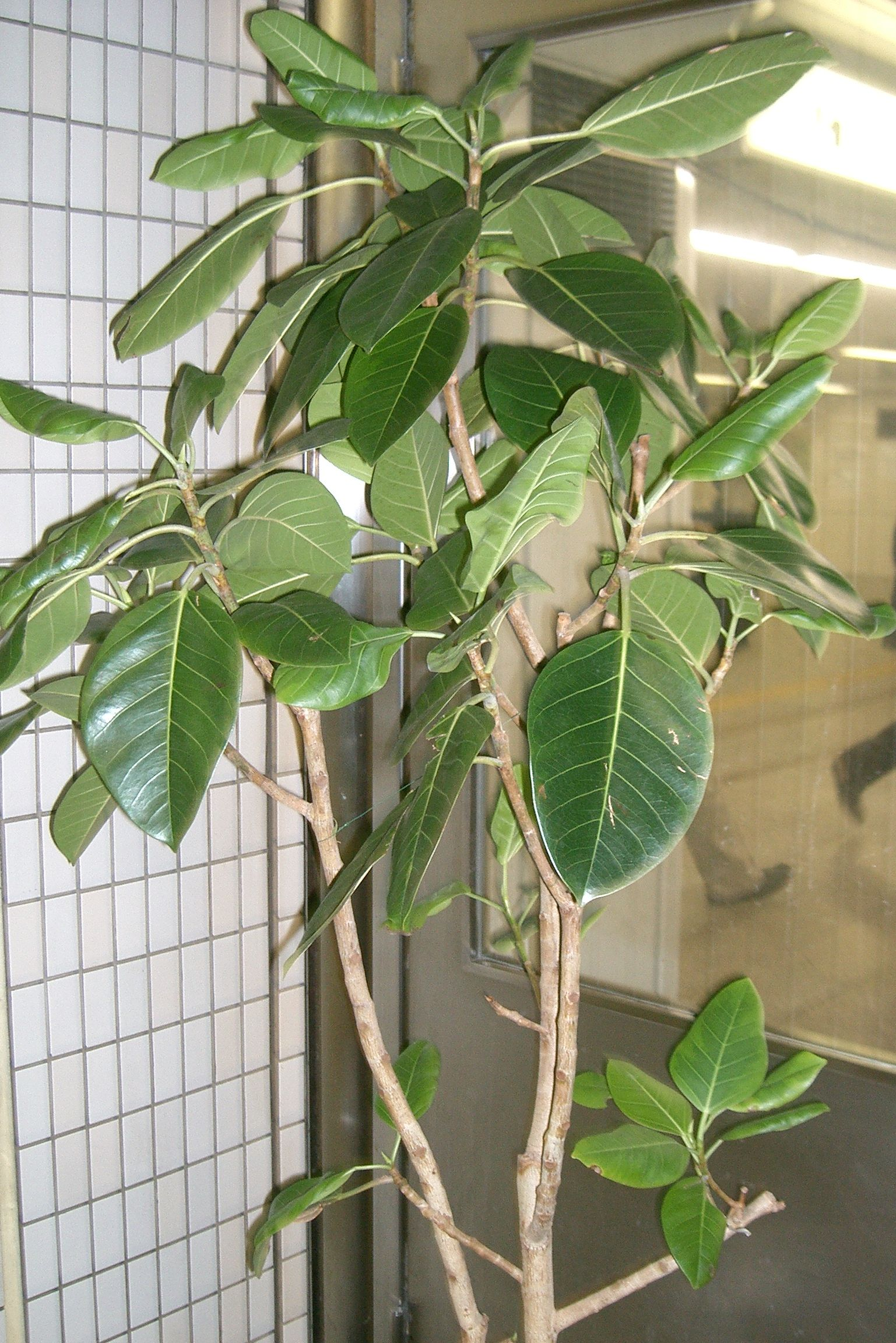

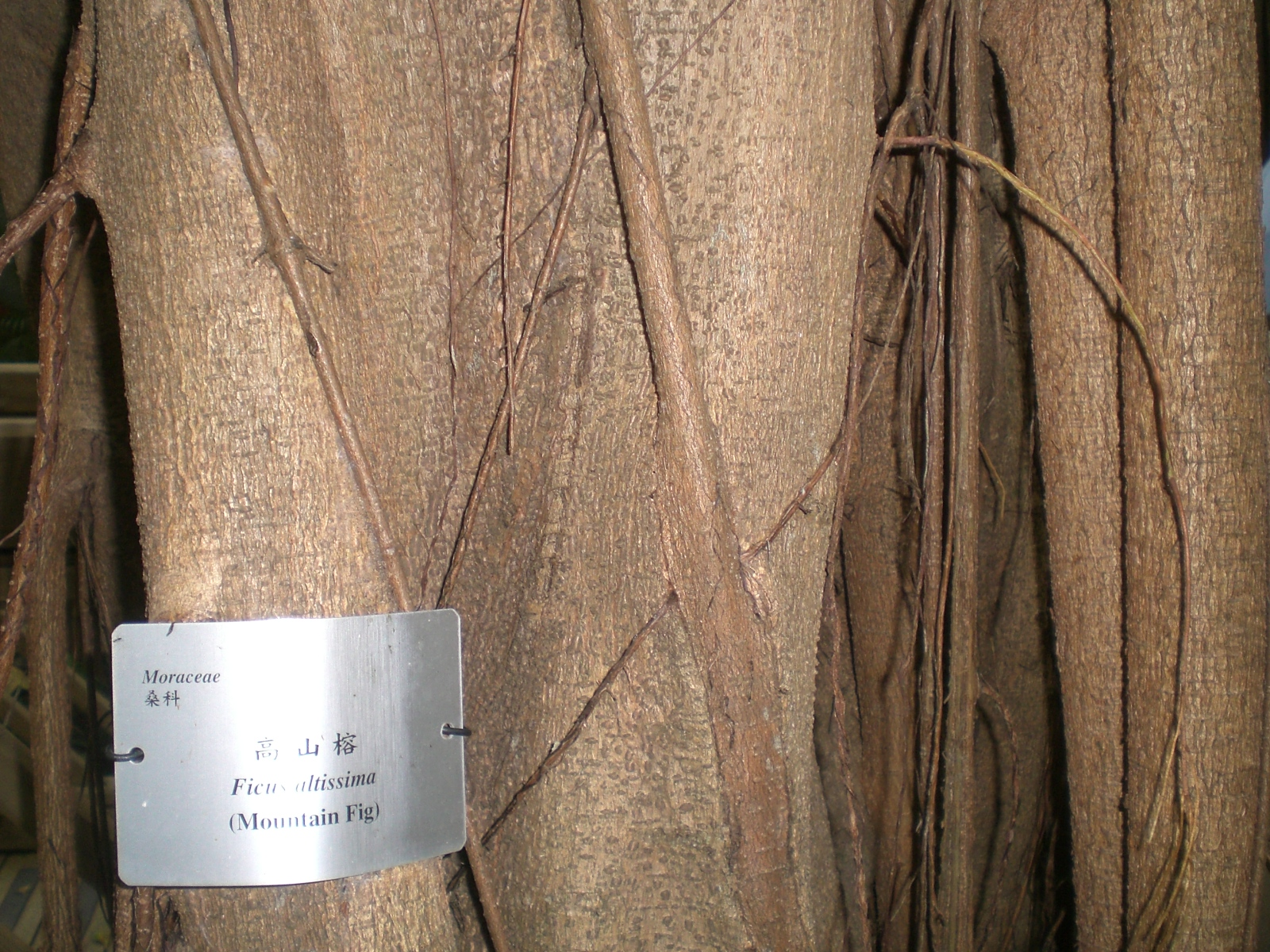

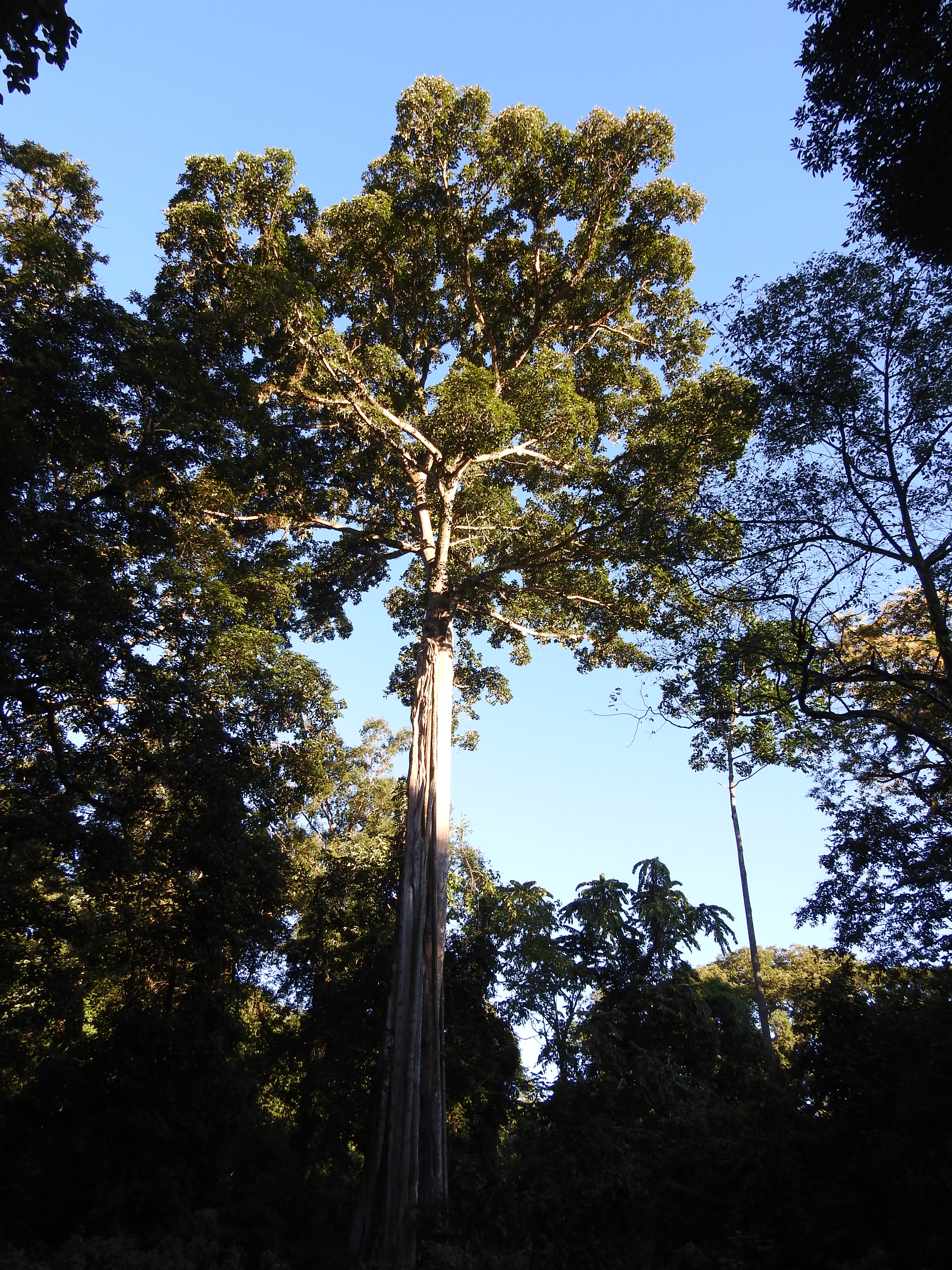

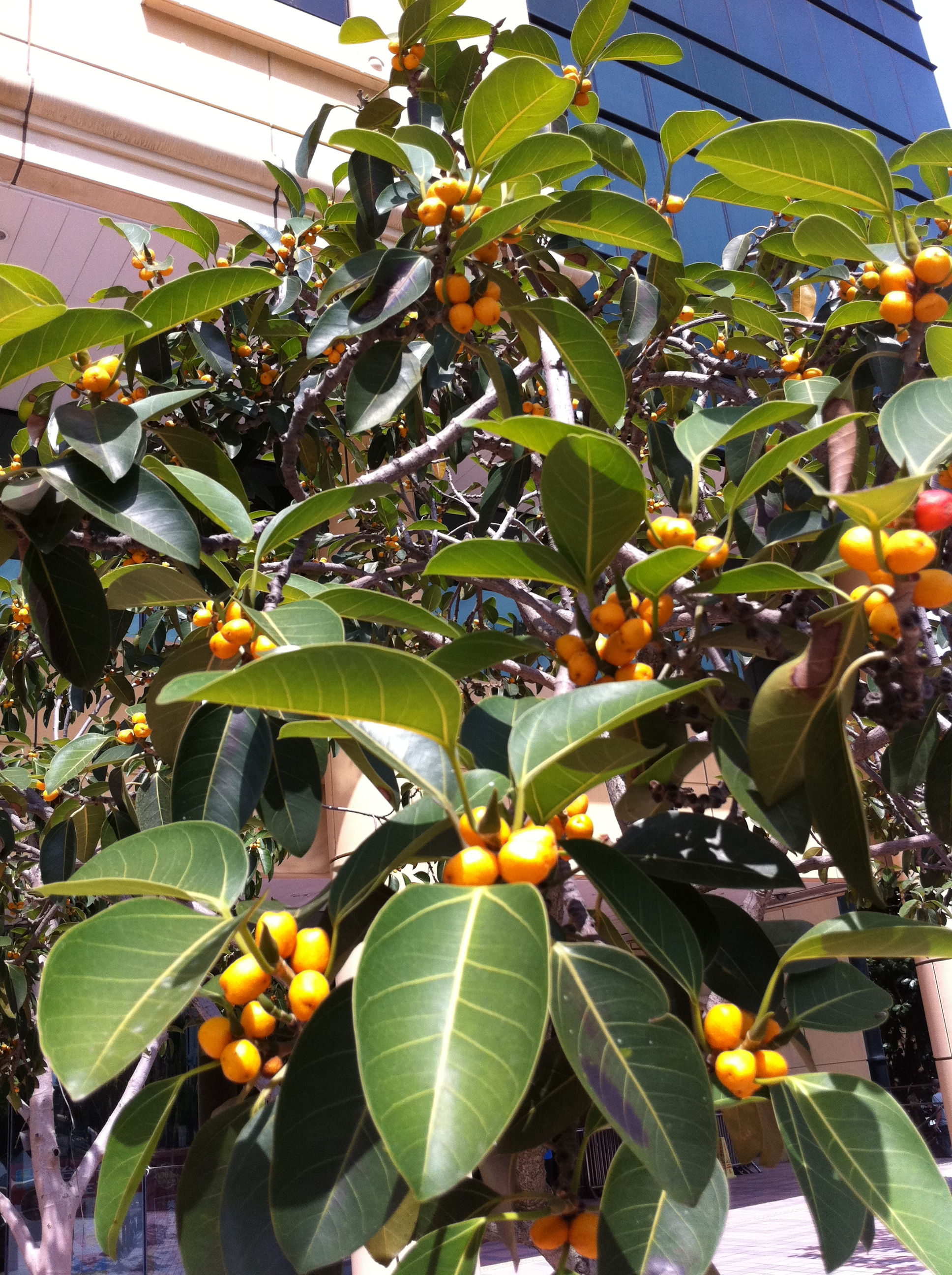

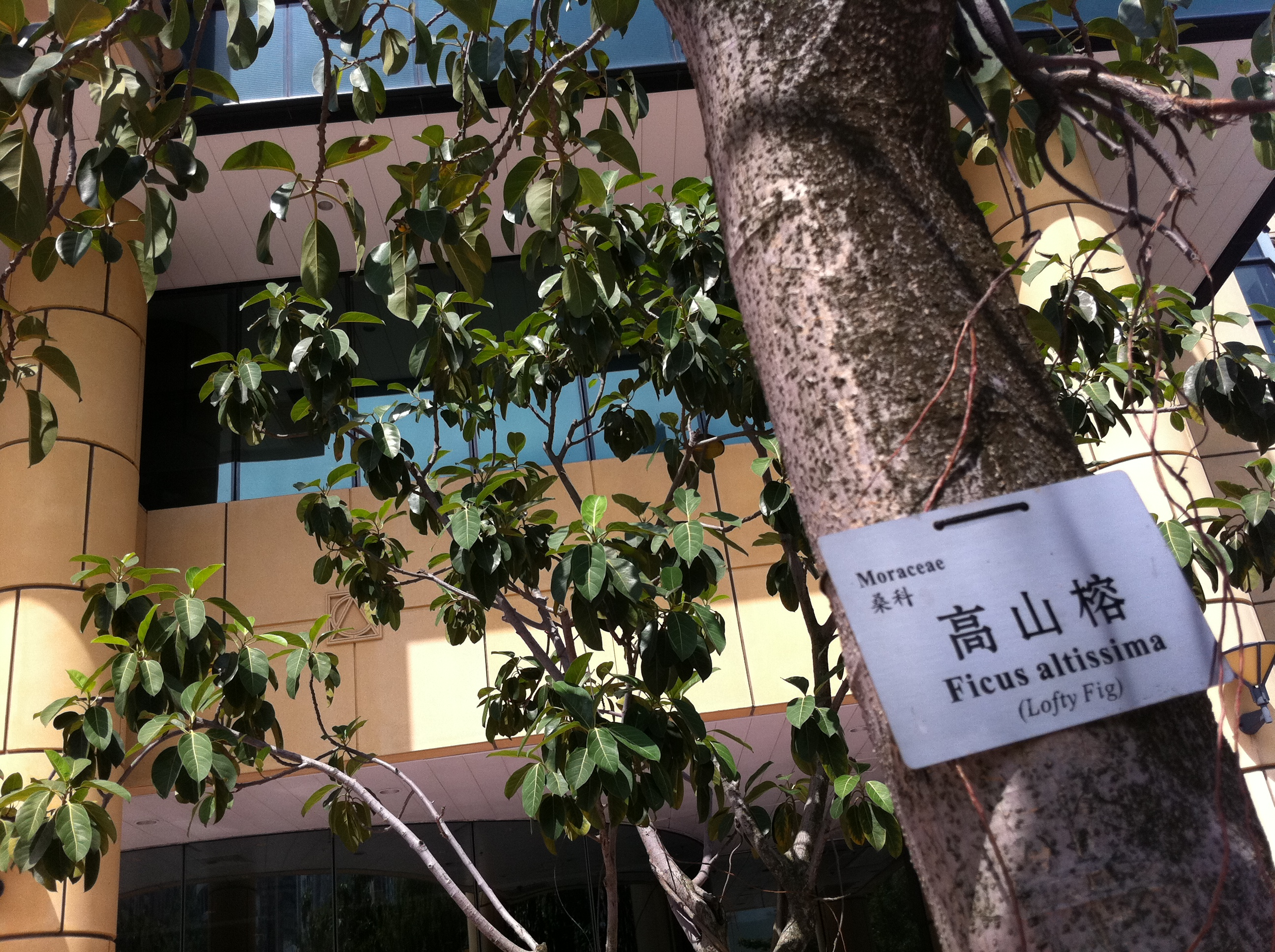

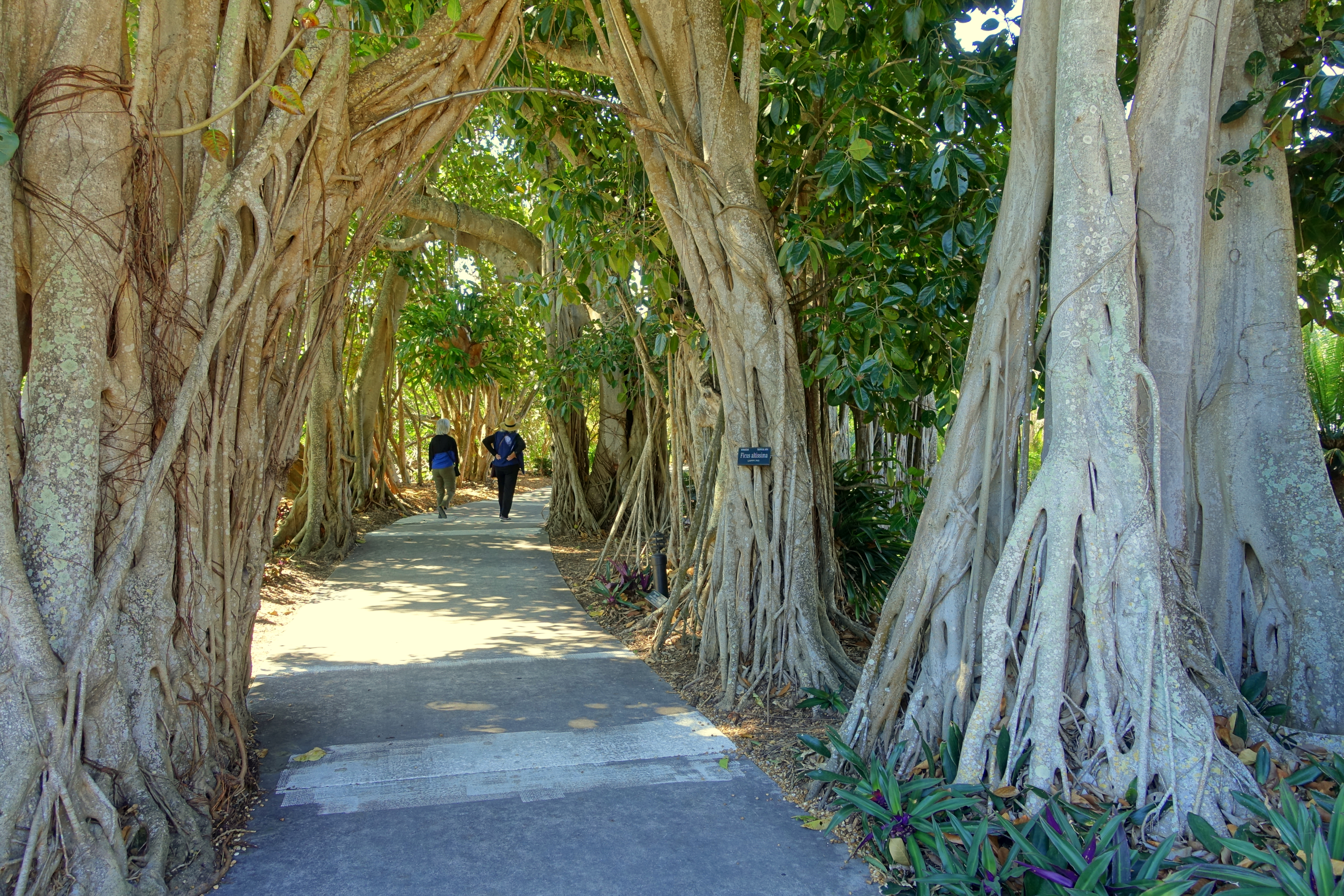
Botanical specimens in the Marie Selby Botanical Gardens, Sarasota, Florida

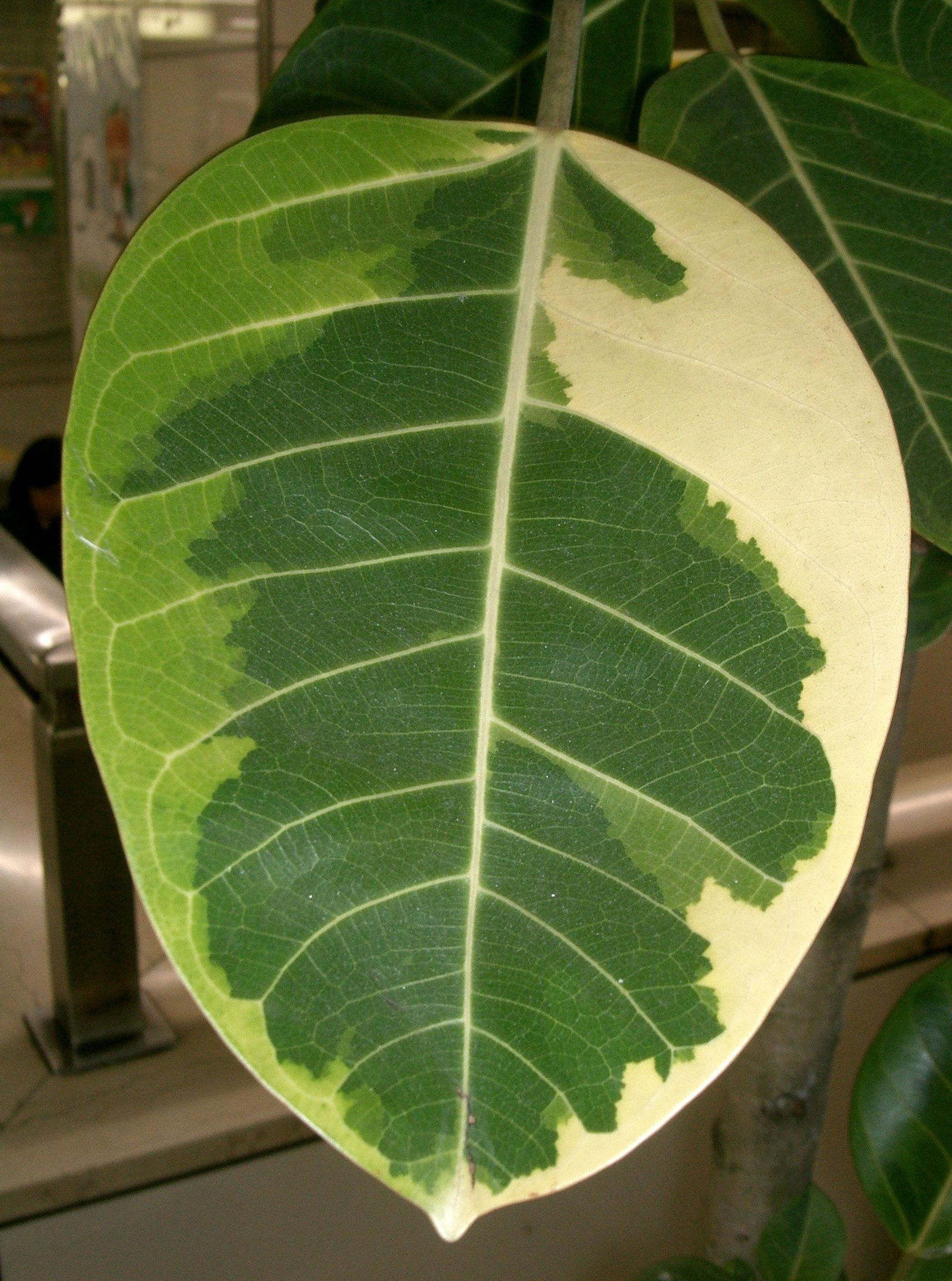
Variegated variety

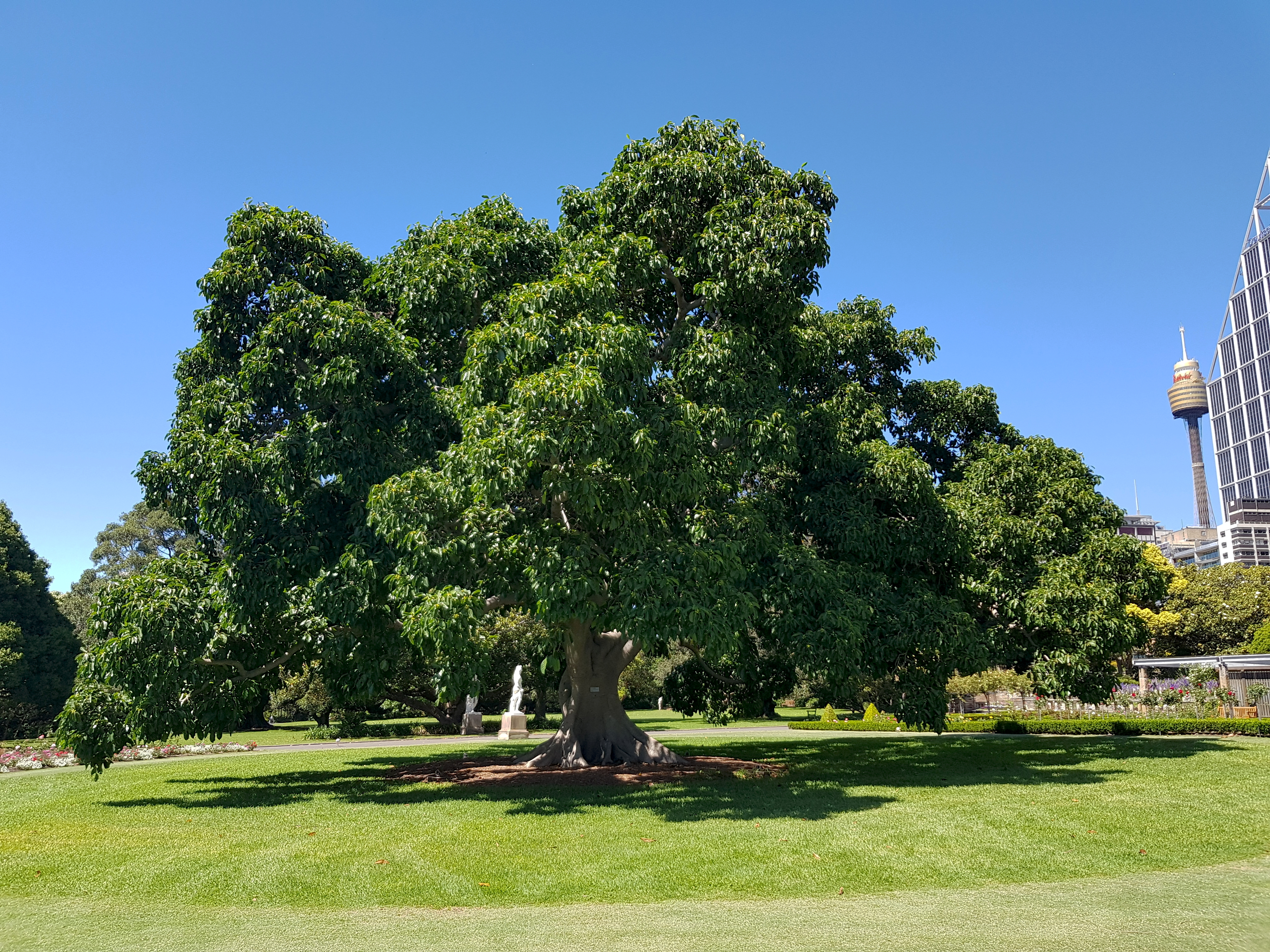
A mature tree in Royal Botanic Garden, Sydney
