= Chameleon ranching =

Raising chameleons for profit

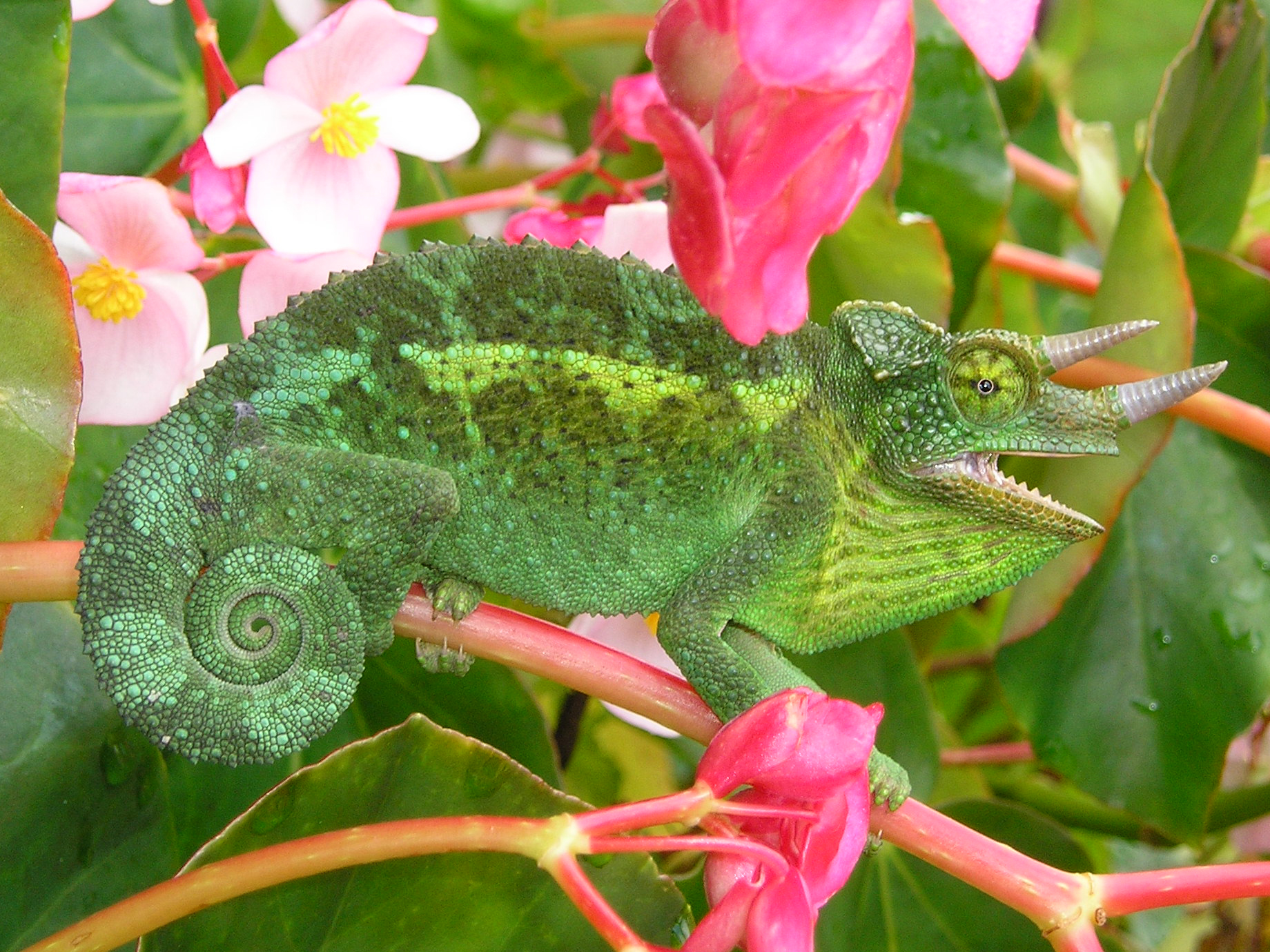
Jackson's Chameleon from the island of Maui, Hawaii

Chameleon ranching is the action of releasing chameleons into an area with the intent of establishing them and later collecting them to sell for a profit. This type of ranching has existed since the 1970s, but has become more widespread around the early 2000s. It is an example of people intentionally releasing a foreign species.

== Background and history ==
Chameleons have always been a staple of the wildlife trade, with the United States in particular accounting for 69% of chameleon imports from 1977 to 2001. As importing the chameleons from their native countries can be costly, some people have decided to release chameleons into the wild on purpose, intending to let them reproduce and then recapturing them. The first case of this was in 1972, when Jackson's chameleons were released by a petshop owner on Kāneʻohe in Hawaii. By 1981, when Kenya stopped importation of its chameleons, all Jackson's chameleons in the pet trade were then sourced from Hawaii.

As Hawaii started to make it illegal to transport or export chameleons in recent years, chameleon ranching shifted towards the state of Florida. Several populations of chameleons were discovered in the early 2000s and have been proved to be reproducing and spreading to new areas. As Florida's law states that no non-native species can be released into the wild, most chameleons that are found or captured are sold into the pet trade.

== Locations ==
=== Hawaii ===
Hawaii has one species of chameleon established on it, the Jackson's chameleon, which was introduced when a pet store owner released a shipment of chameleons on Kāneʻohe in 1972. The shipment of chameleons were skinny and dehydrated, and were released into the owner's backyard so that they could revitalize themselves, instead escaping outside his property and into the adjacent wilderness. From here, the chameleons managed to reach Maui by the 1980s, where they thrived in the warm and humid climate similar to their natural habitat of Eastern Africa. While they prefer high elevations at around from 700 to 823 m (2300 to 2700 ft), they can also be found in scrubland and on beaches.

Jackson's chameleons have since managed to colonize Hawaiʻi and Oʻahu, most likely due to humans intentionally spreading them. They are illegal to own or transport in an attempt to keep them from spreading to Kauaʻi or Lana'i.

=== Florida ===
Florida has several chameleon species that have been found in the wild, although only three are so far confirmed to have established reproducing populations. These three species are veiled chameleons, panther chameleons, and Oustalet's chameleons. Here in Florida, these chameleons can be found in degraded or urban areas with open vegetation that allows the chameleon to get both sunlight and shelter. Most of these populations are found in the southern part of the state where it rarely freezes.

Veiled chameleons were first discovered in 2002 in Fort Myers, Lee County, but has satellite populations in other parts of Lee County along with Collier County. The distance between these populations suggest that they were collected from the Fort Myers location and then released elsewhere, and not from the chameleons spreading themselves. Panther chameleons are known from Broward County, where a population was discovered in Coconut Creek in 2013. Oustalet's giant chameleons were first confirmed to be reproducing in Miami-Dade County in 2010; however, they may have been around since at least 2000, originating from an animal importer who released them into an avocado orchard on their property.

It is relatively unknown what effects these chameleons have on the ecosystem. A study of the diet of introduced Oustalet's chameleons revealed them to prey on snails, moths and their larvae, grasshoppers, and brown anoles (which are another invasive lizard themselves). Due to several reasons such as the fact that many populations encompass private property, the chameleon's camouflage abilities and cryptic nature, along with their exact effects on the environment believed to be mostly harmless, chameleons are not a priority species for wildlife authorities to eradicate.

=== California ===
A small established population of Jackson's chameleons exist in several locations throughout southern California, most notably Morro Bay. The Morro Bay population is rumored to have been started during a Fish and Wildlife raid in 1981 on a person who was suspected of selling prohibited reptiles, unknowingly releasing several chameleons into the wild when they left open a cage that they believed to be empty. The foggy climate of Morro Bay allows the chameleons to get adequate moisture to not dehydrate in the otherwise hot climate. There are also satellite populations in San Luis Obispo County and Orange County.

There may also be populations of veiled chameleons (Contra Costa County and San Diego County) and panther chameleons (San Diego County), although it is unknown if they are ultimately sustainable or if they eventually become extirpated.
