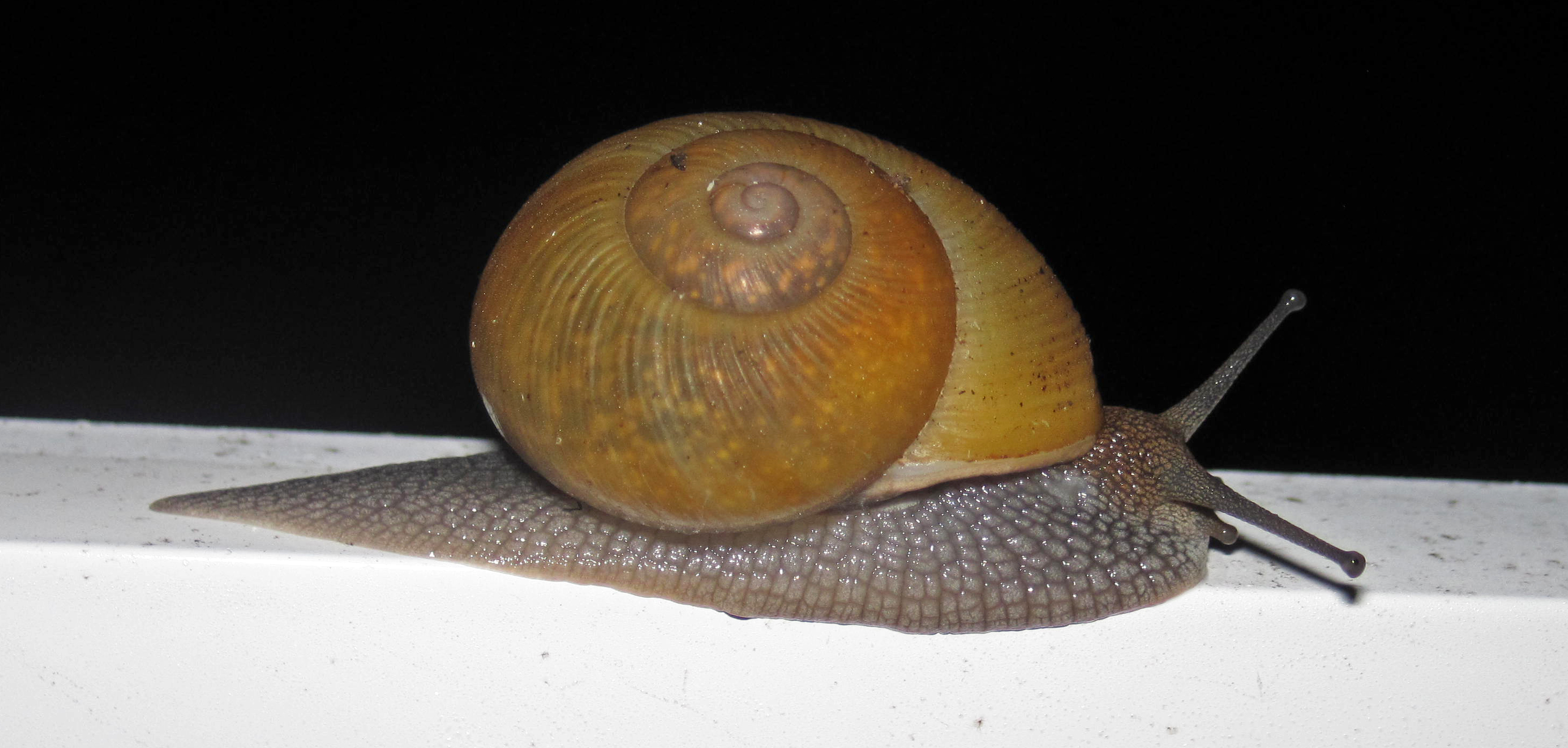

Scientific classification
- Kingdom: Animalia
- Phylum: Mollusca
- Class: Gastropoda
- Order: Stylommatophora
- Family: Zachrysiidae
- Genus: Zachrysia
- Species: Z. trinitaria

Binomial name
- Zachrysia trinitaria (Pfeiffer, 1858)

Synonyms
- Helix trinitaria Pfeiffer, 1858

= Zachrysia trinitaria =

Species of gastropod

Zachrysia trinitaria is a species of land snail in the family Zachrysiidae. It is native to Cuba but established in the United States.

== Distribution ==
This species is already established in the United States, and is considered to represent a potentially serious threat as a pest, an invasive species which could negatively affect agriculture, natural ecosystems, human health or commerce. Therefore it has been suggested that this species be given top national quarantine significance in the USA.
