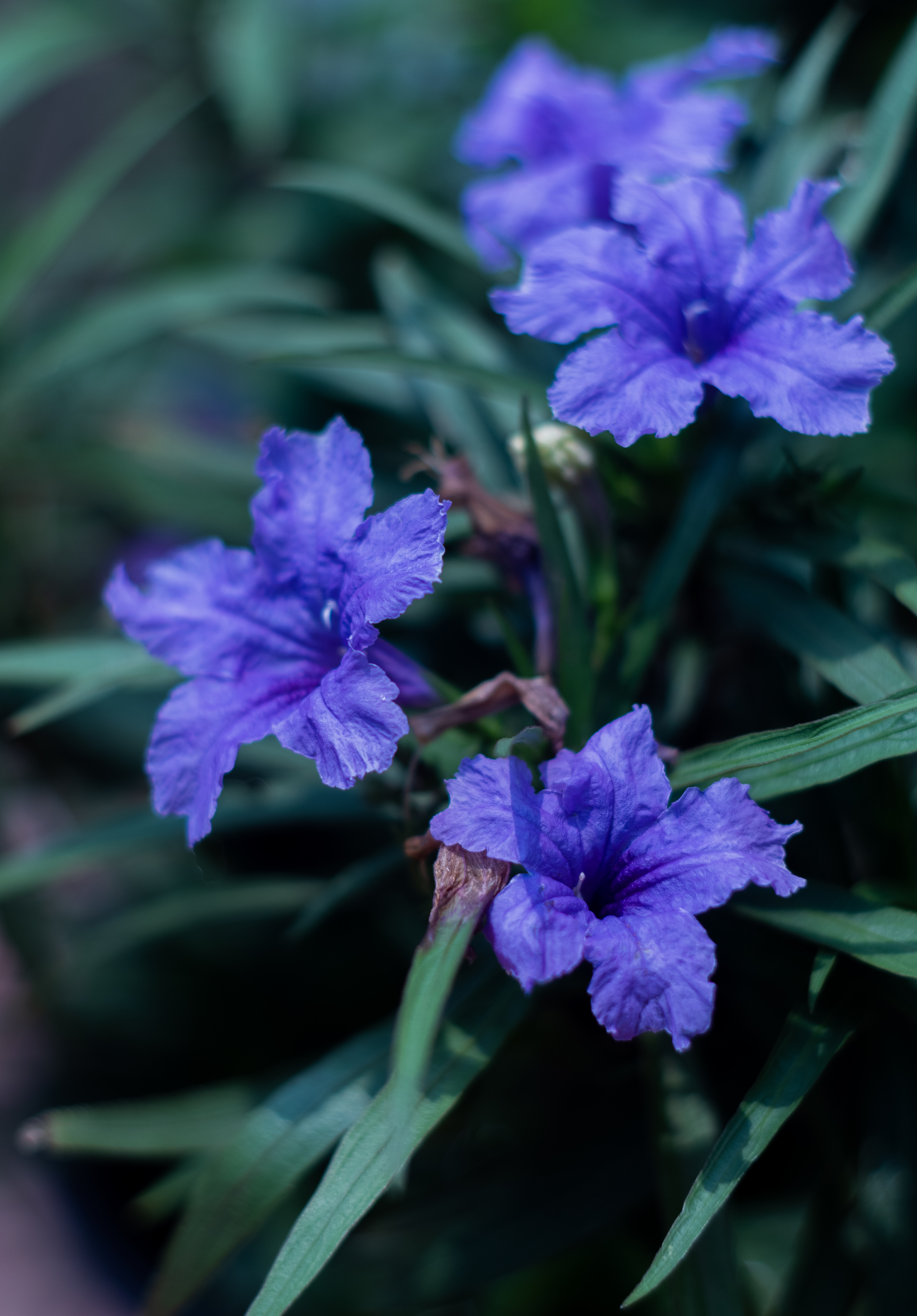

Scientific classification
- Kingdom: Plantae
- Clade: Tracheophytes
- Clade: Angiosperms
- Clade: Eudicots
- Clade: Asterids
- Order: Lamiales
- Family: Acanthaceae
- Genus: Ruellia
- Species: R. simplex

Binomial name
- Ruellia simplex C.Wright

Synonyms
- See text

= Ruellia simplex =

Species of flowering plant

Ruellia simplex, the Mexican petunia, Mexican bluebell, Britton's wild petunia, or Purple showers, is a species of flowering plant in the family Acanthaceae that is native to Mexico, the Caribbean, and South America. It has become a widespread invasive plant in Florida, where it was likely introduced as an ornamental before 1933, as well as in the eastern Mediterranean, South Asia and other parts of the Eastern Hemisphere.

== Taxonomy and synonyms ==
Ruellia simplex (Wright) is the oldest and accepted name for this species, which has been variously called Ruellia angustifolia (Nees, Lindau), Ruellia brittoniana (Leonard), and Cryphiacanthus angustifolius (Nees), among others. The genus is named after French botanist Jean Ruel, while the specific name refers to the simple, not compound leaves.

== Description ==
Ruellia simplex is an evergreen perennial growing 3 ft (0.91 m) tall, forming colonies of stalks with lance-shaped leaves that are 6 to 12 in (15 to 30 cm) long and .5 to .75 in (1.3 to 1.9 cm) wide.

The flowers are metallic blue to purple, trumpet-shaped with an about 2 in (5.1 cm)-wide, five-lobed corolla. There is a dwarf variety that is only 1 ft (0.30 m) tall.

== Distribution ==
Ruellia simplex is native to Mexico, the West Indies, western Bolivia, southwestern Brazil, Paraguay, Uruguay, and northeastern Argentina. It has been widely used as an ornamental plant and has escaped from cultivation in the United States, Australia and parts of Asia, as well as several Pacific Islands.

It has become invasive in some of these areas, forming dense, single-species stands of vegetation which threaten native plants. It is mainly a plant of wet places such as ditches, pond verges, lakesides and marshes, but can survive in drier conditions.

== Control ==
The University of Florida's Institute of Food and Agricultural Sciences is trying to reduce the number of home gardeners who plant R. simplex by recommending alternatives, especially Silphium asteriscus, Sisyrinchium angustifolium, Stachytarpheta jamaicensis, Stokesia laevis, but also including some R. simplex cultivars that are sterile.

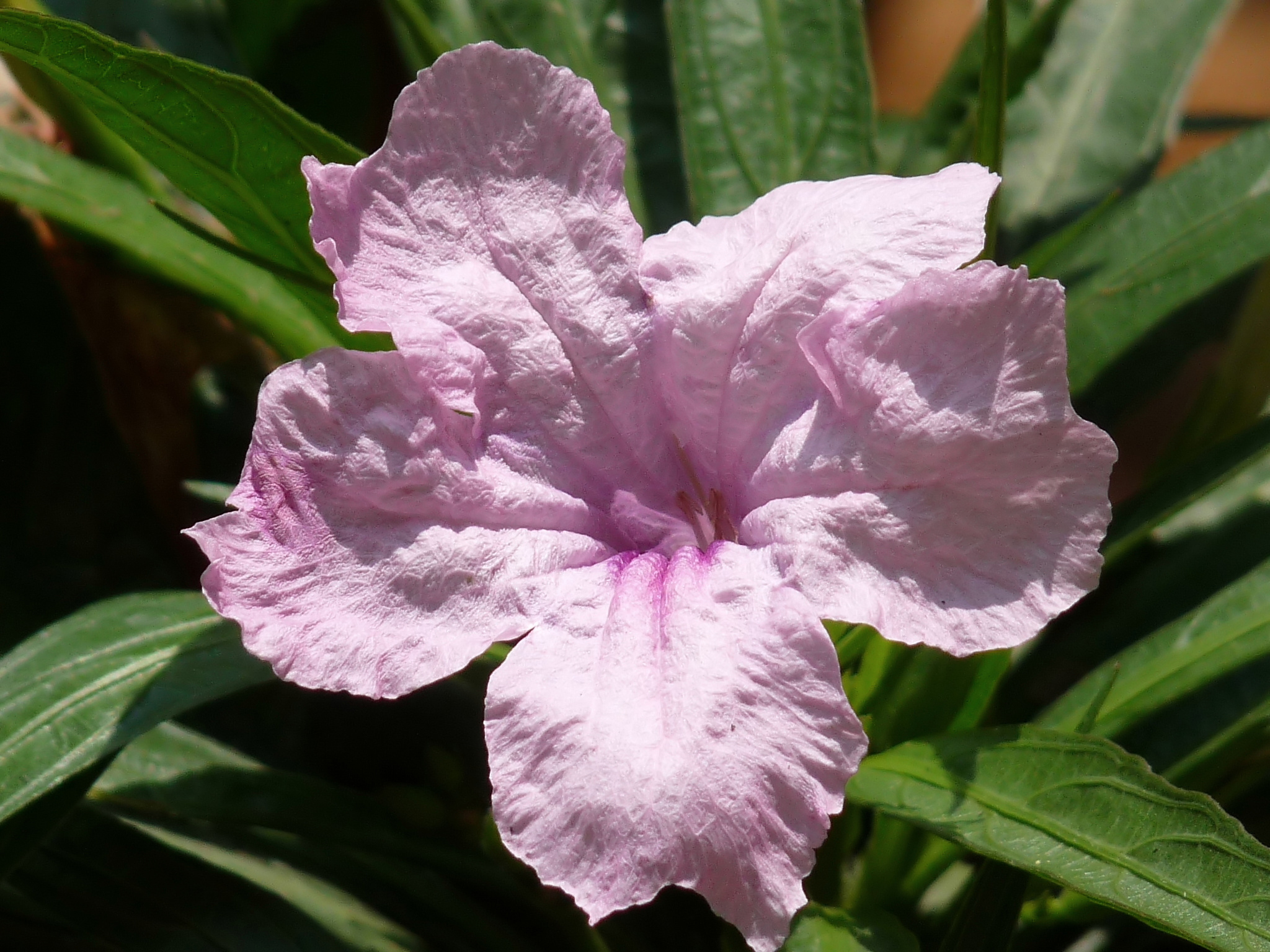
Ruellia simplex, pink

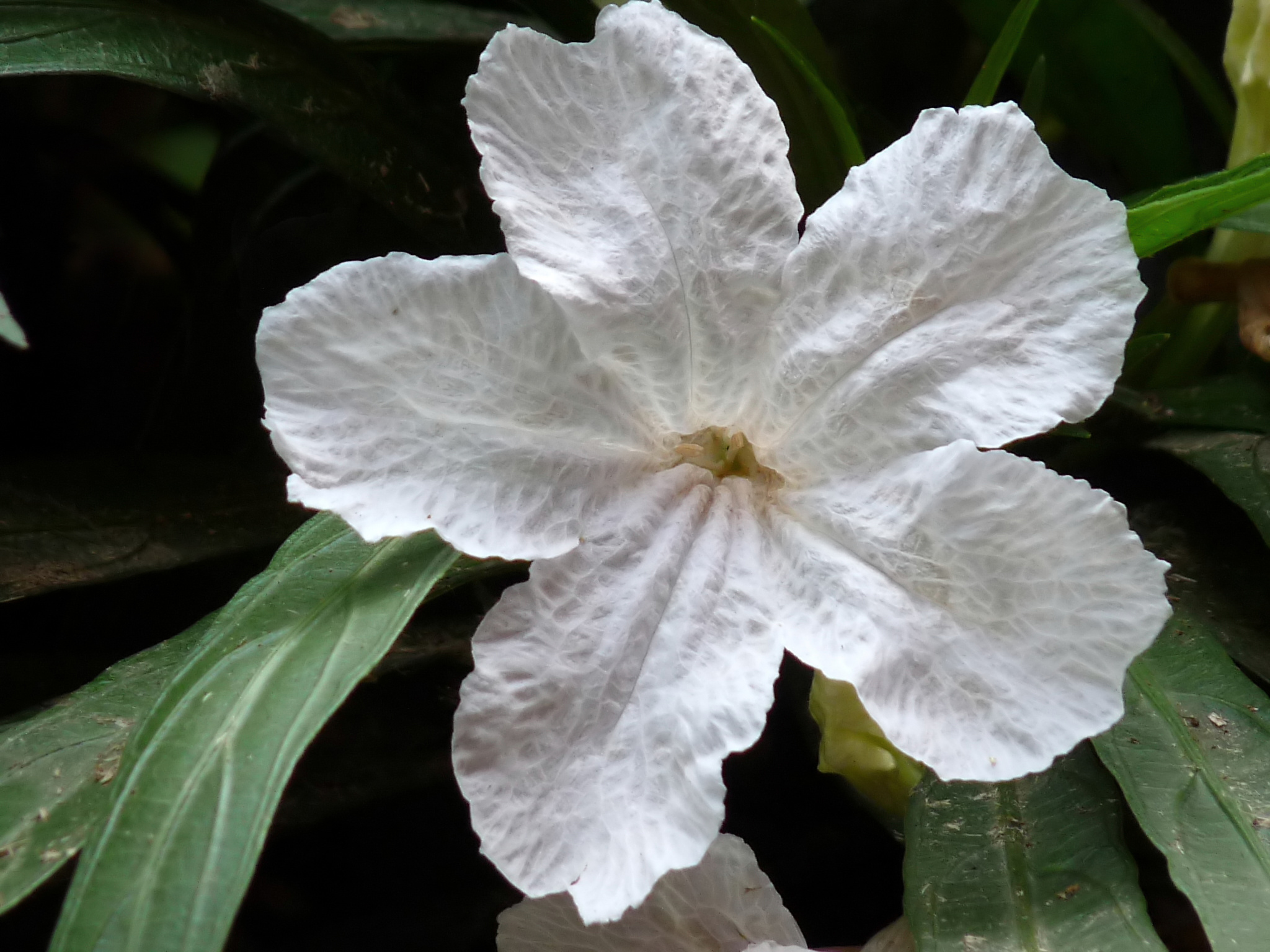
Ruellia simplex, white

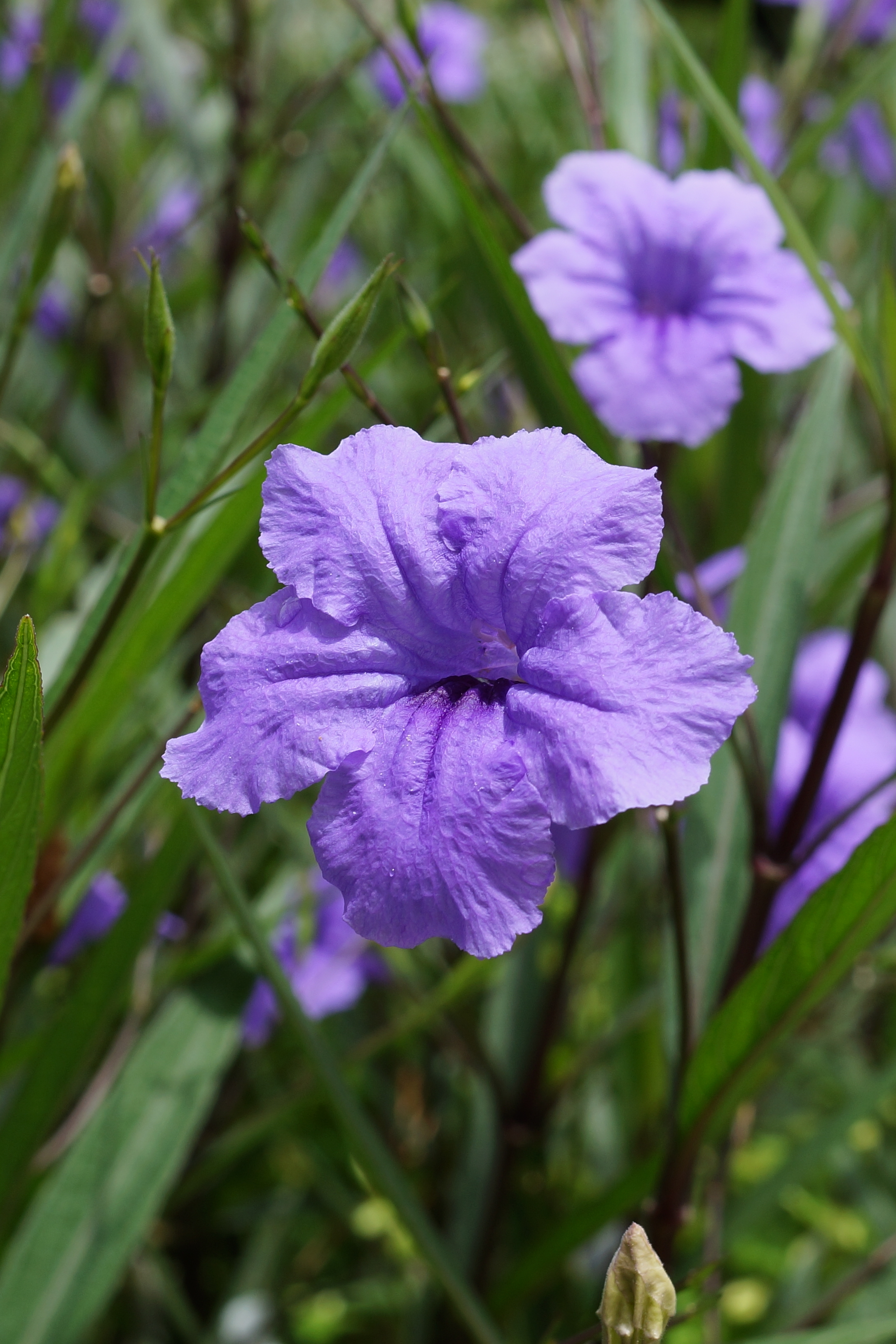
Trumpet shaped flowers

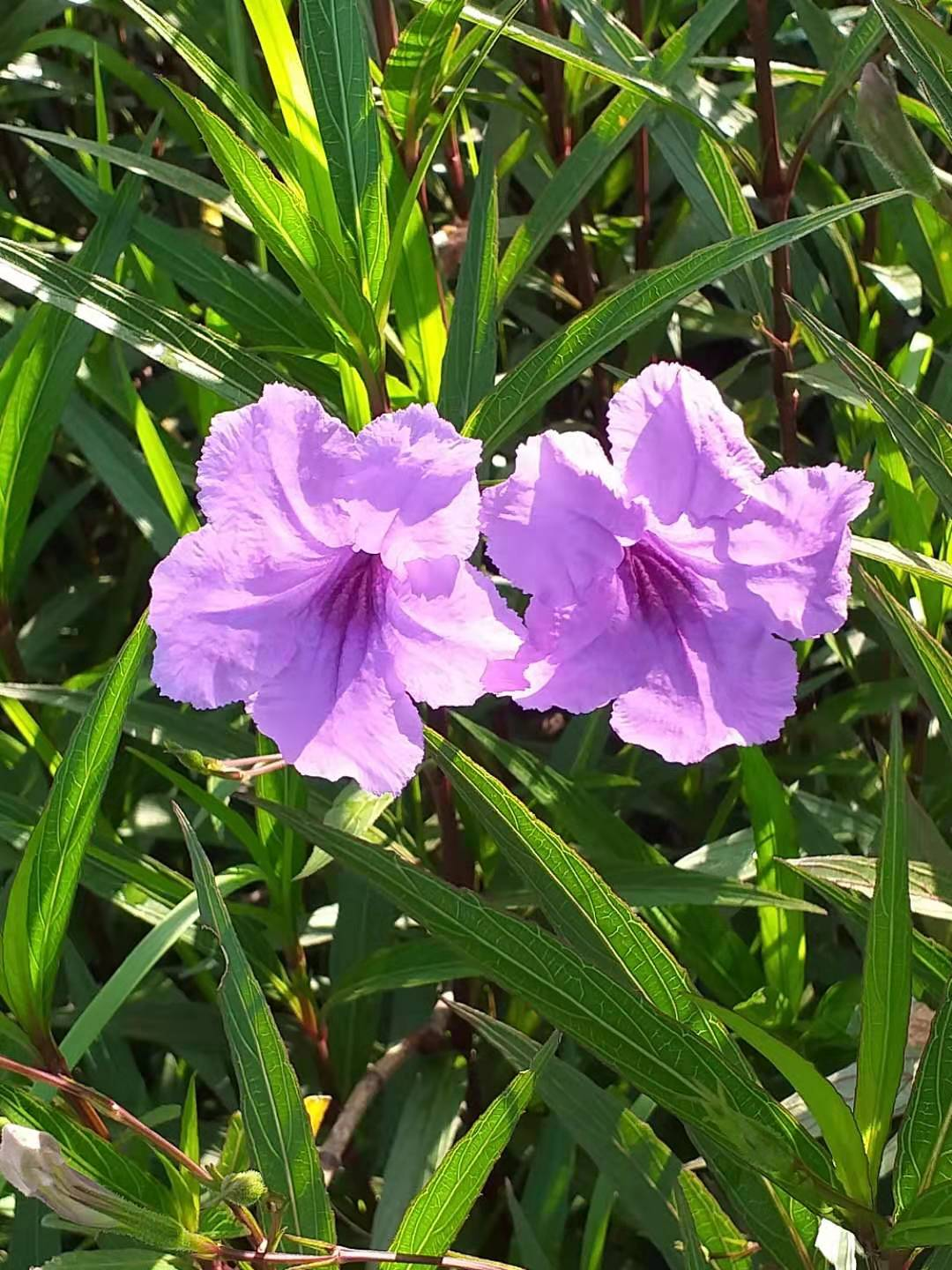
Leaves and stem

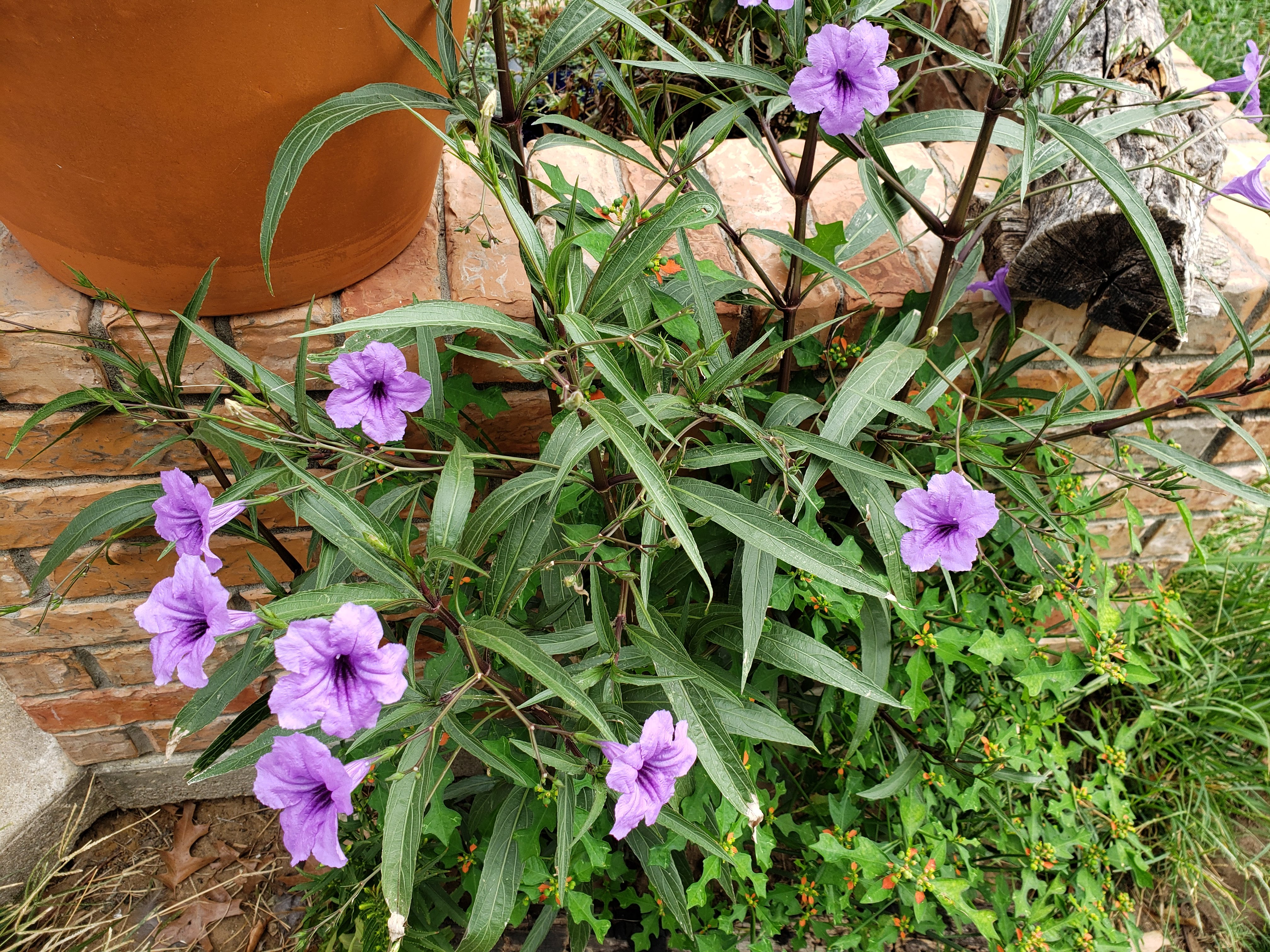
Blooms often fall within hours.
