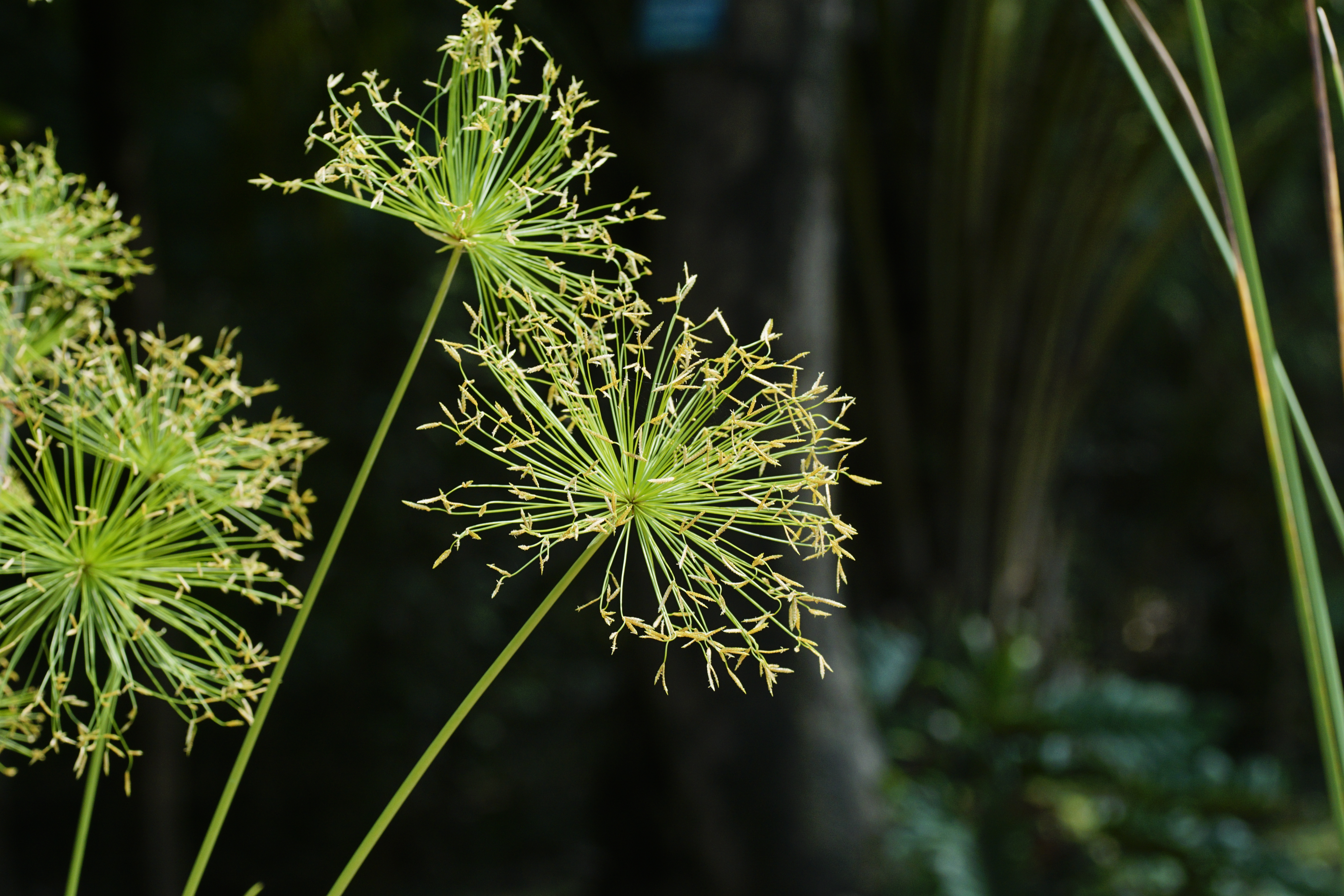

Scientific classification
- Kingdom: Plantae
- Clade: Tracheophytes
- Clade: Angiosperms
- Clade: Monocots
- Clade: Commelinids
- Order: Poales
- Family: Cyperaceae
- Genus: Cyperus
- Species: C. prolifer

Binomial name
- Cyperus prolifer Lam., 1791

= Cyperus prolifer =

Species of sedge

Cyperus prolifer is a species of sedge that is native to eastern Africa, ranging from Somalia to the Cape Provinces of South Africa, and to Madagascar and Mauritius. It is introduced and considered invasive in Florida.

== See also ==
- List of Cyperus species
