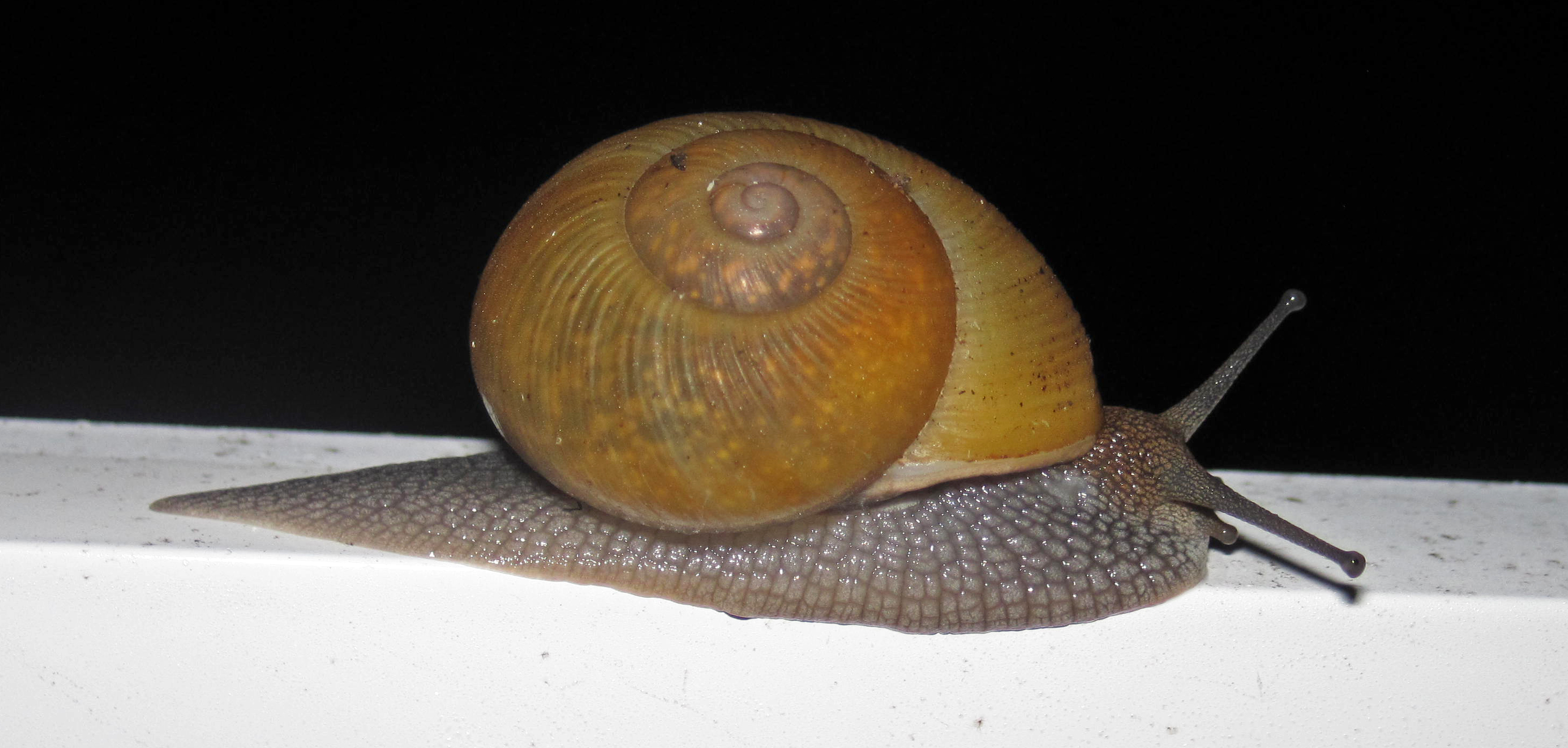
- Zachrysia trinitaria

Scientific classification
- Kingdom: Animalia
- Phylum: Mollusca
- Class: Gastropoda
- Order: Stylommatophora
- Suborder: Helicina
- Superfamily: Sagdoidea
- Family: Zachrysiidae; D. G. Robinson, Sei & Rosenberg, 2017

= Zachrysiidae =

Family of gastropods

Zachrysiidae is a family of air-breathing land snails, terrestrial pulmonate gastropod molluscs in the superfamily Sagdoidea. It is native to Cuba, though some species have been introduced to Florida, West Indies islands, the Yucatán Peninsula of Mexico and Panama.

== Description ==
Zachrysiidae have solid and thick shells 16-70 mm in width and pale yellow to orange in colour. The shape is generally globose but depressed and somewhat eccentrically and unevenly coiled. The protoconch is 1.5 whorls that are polished and shiny with faint, microscopic, spiral lines. The teleoconch is 4-4.5 whorls and varies in sculpture from sharply and finely ribbed to almost smooth. There may be a microsculpture of closely crowded granules and these are sometimes arranged in irregular spiral striae. The aperture is oblique and downturned at maturity, with a thickened and reflexed lip. The baso-columellar margin is expanded with a slight tooth. Adults are not umbilicate and juveniles are minutely umbilicate.

This family is unique in its reproductive anatomy. The right ommatophoral retractor muscle passes to the left of the genitalia. The phallus is thick and the phallus chamber in most species has one or two fleshy structures (stimulus or stimulators). The epiphallus is very short. The flagellum is thick and blunt-ended. Most species also have another structure, variously called the accessory flagellum or the penial caecum, attached separately to the phallus. The gametolytic gland duct is coiled around the phallus retractor muscle and separates from the oviduct throughout its length. Additionally, the gametolytic gland duct is short, swollen basally and has a relatively large reservoir. The ovotestis or gonad consists of very elongated acini, and there is no vagina.

== Classification ==
Zachrysia was once placed in the family Pleurodontidae in the superfamily Helicoidea. A 2017 phylogenetic analysis transferred it to the new family Zachrysiidae in the superfamily Sagdoidea.

== Genera ==
- Zachrysia Pilsbry, 1894
