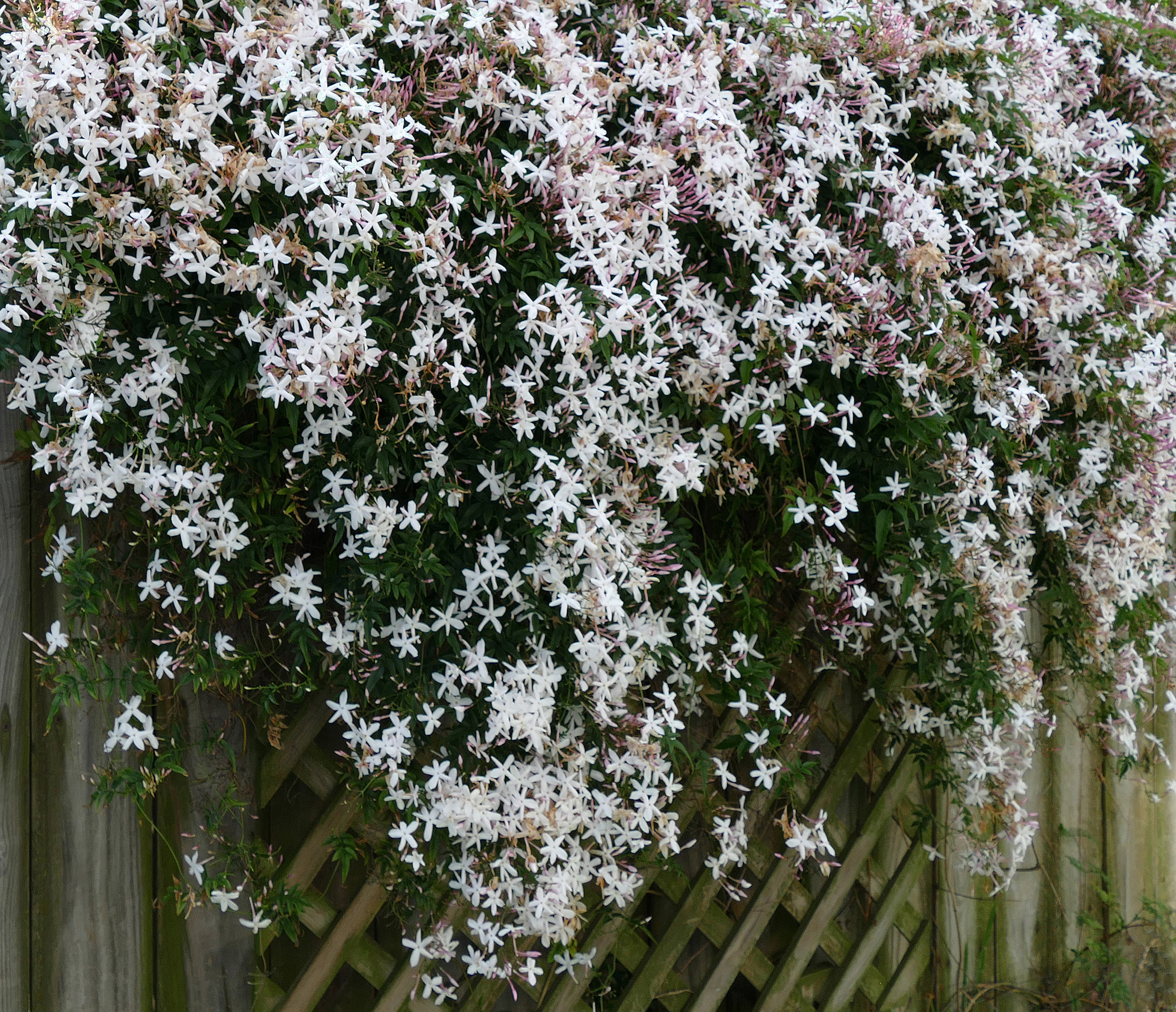
- Jasminum flower

Scientific classification
- Kingdom: Plantae
- Clade: Tracheophytes
- Clade: Angiosperms
- Clade: Eudicots
- Clade: Asterids
- Order: Lamiales
- Family: Oleaceae
- Tribe: Jasmineae
- Genus: Jasminum; L.

Type species
- Jasminum officinale

Species
- More than 200, see List of Jasminum species

Synonyms
- Mogorium Juss.; Noldeanthus Knobl.; Nyctanthos St.-Lag.

= Jasmine =

Genus of flowering plants in the olive family

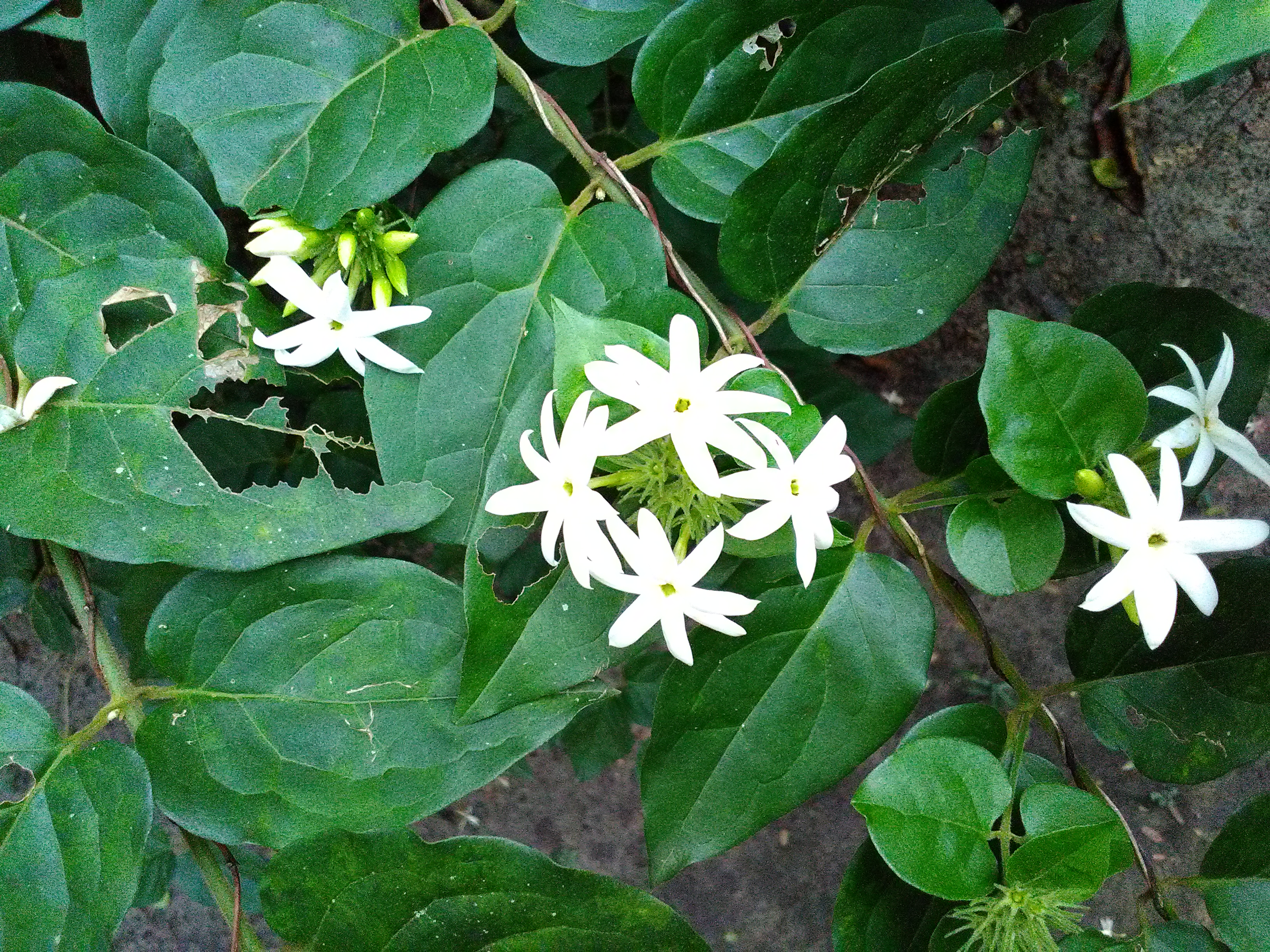
Common jasmine

Jasmine (botanical name: Jasminum, pronounced /ˈjæsmɪnəm/ YAS-min-əm) is a genus of shrubs and vines in the olive family of Oleaceae. It contains around 200 species native to tropical and warm temperate regions of Asia, Africa, and Oceania. Jasmines are widely cultivated for the characteristic fragrance of their flowers.

The village of Shubra Beloula in Egypt grows most of the jasmine used by the global perfume industry.

== Description ==
Jasmine can be either deciduous or evergreen, and can be erect, spreading, or climbing shrubs and vines. The leaves are borne in opposing or alternating arrangement and can be of simple, trifoliate, or pinnate formation.

The flowers are typically around 2.5 cm (0.98 in) in diameter. They are white or yellow, although in rare instances they can be slightly reddish. The flowers are borne in cymose clusters with a minimum of three flowers, though they can also be solitary on the ends of branchlets. Each flower has about four to nine petals, two locules, and one to four ovules. They have two stamens with very short filaments. The bracts are linear or ovate. The calyx is bell-shaped. They are usually very fragrant.

The basic chromosome number of the genus is 13, and most species are diploid (2n=26). However, natural polyploidy exists, particularly in Jasminum sambac (triploid 3n=39), Jasminum flexile (tetraploid 4n=52), Jasminum mesnyi (triploid 3n=39), and Jasminum angustifolium (tetraploid 4n=52).

== Distribution and habitat ==
Jasmines are native to tropical and subtropical regions of Asia, Africa, Australasia within Oceania. Their center of diversity is in South Asia and Southeast Asia.

Several jasmine species have become naturalized in Mediterranean Europe. For example, the so-called Spanish jasmine (Jasminum grandiflorum) was originally from West Asia, the Indian subcontinent, Northeast Africa, and East Africa, and is now naturalized in the Iberian Peninsula.

Jasminum fluminense (which is sometimes known by the inaccurate name "Brazilian Jasmine") and Jasminum dichotomum (Gold Coast Jasmine) are invasive species in Hawaii and Florida. Jasminum polyanthum, also known as pink jasmine, is an invasive weed in Australia.

== Etymology ==
The name comes from Old French jessemin, from Persian: یاسمن, romanized: yāsamin which is derived from the Middle Persian word yāsaman and yāsamīn (يَاسَمِين) in Arabic. The word entered Middle French around 1570 and was first used in English in 16th century England. The Persian name is also the origin of the genus name, Jasminum.

== Taxonomy ==
Species belonging to the genus are classified under the tribe Jasmineae of the olive family (Oleaceae). Jasminum is divided into five sections—Alternifolia, Jasminum, Primulina, Trifoliolata, and Unifoliolata.

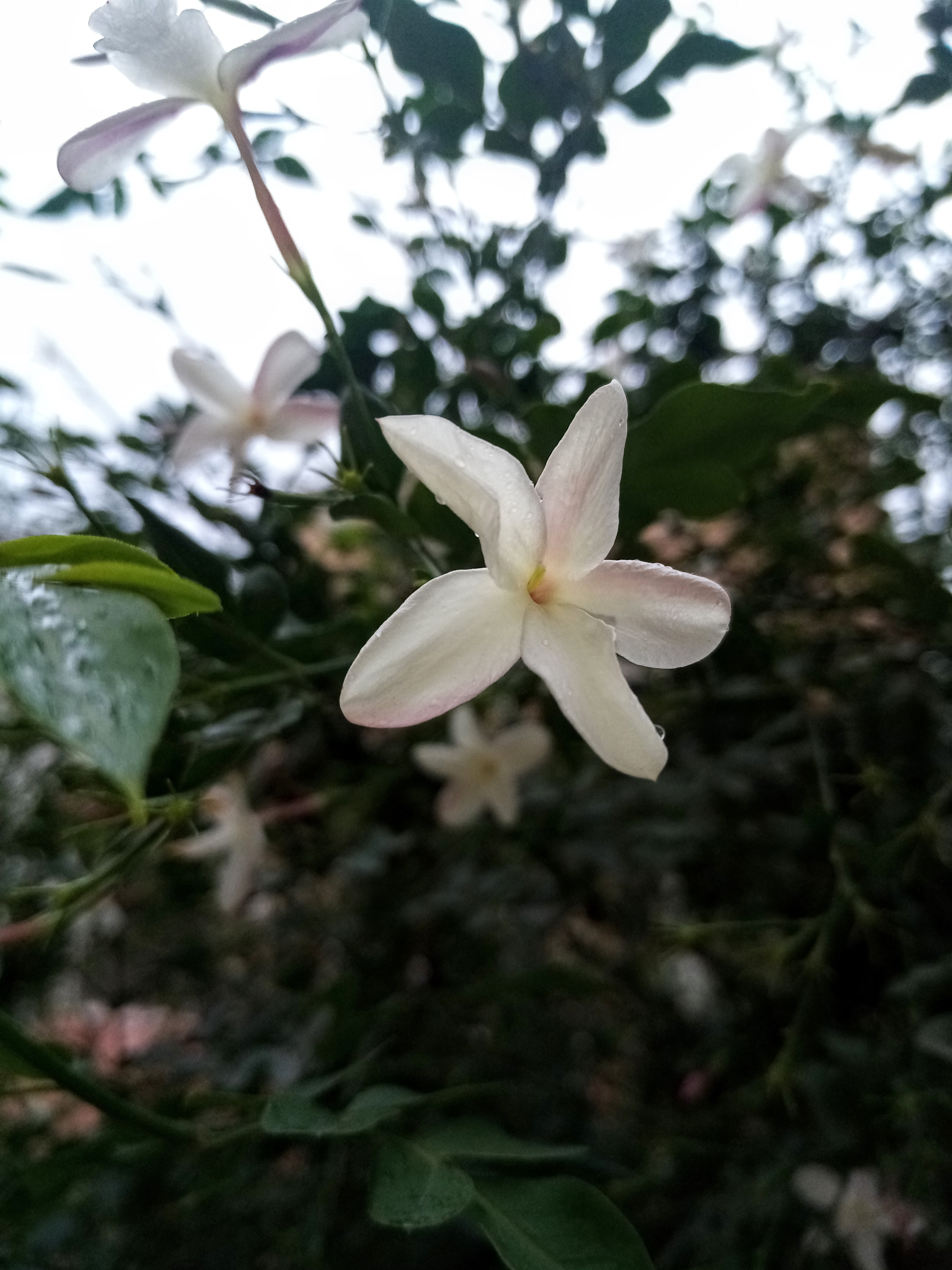

=== Species ===
Species include:

- J. abyssinicum Hochst. ex DC. – forest jasmine
- J. adenophyllum Wall. – bluegrape jasmine, pinwheel jasmine, princess jasmine
- J. andamanicum N.P.Balakr. & N.G.Nair
- J. angulare Vahl
- J. angustifolium (L.) Willd.
- J. auriculatum Vahl – Indian jasmine, needle-flower jasmine
- J. azoricum L.
- J. beesianum Forrest & Diels – red jasmine
- J. dichotomum Vahl – Gold Coast jasmine
- J. didymum G.Forst.
- J. dispermum Wall.
- J. elegans Knobl.
- J. elongatum (P.J.Bergius) Willd.
- J. floridum Bunge
- J. fluminense Vell.
- J. fruticans L.
- J. grandiflorum L. – Catalan jasmine, jasmin odorant, royal jasmine, Spanish jasmine
- J. grandiflorum L.Vell.
- J. humile L. – Italian jasmine, Italian yellow jasmine
- J. lanceolarium Roxb.
- J. laurifolium Roxb. ex Hornem. angel-wing jasmine
- J. malabaricum Wight
- J. mesnyi Hance – Japanese jasmine, primrose jasmine, yellow jasmine
- J. multiflorum (Burm.f.) Andrews – Indian jasmine, star jasmine, winter jasmine
- J. multipartitum Hochst. – starry wild jasmine
- J. nervosum Lour.
- J. nobile C.B.Clarke
- J. nudiflorum Lindl. – winter jasmine
- J. odoratissimum L. – yellow jasmine
- J. officinale L. – common jasmine, jasmine, jessamine, poet's jasmine, summer jasmine, white jasmine
- J. parkeri Dunn – dwarf jasmine
- J. polyanthum Franch.
- J. sambac (L.) Aiton – Arabian jasmine, Sambac jasmine
- J. simplicifolium G.Forst.
- J. sinense Hemsl.
- J. subhumile W.W.Sm.
- J. tortuosum Willd.
- J. urophyllum Hemsl.
- J. volubile Jacq.
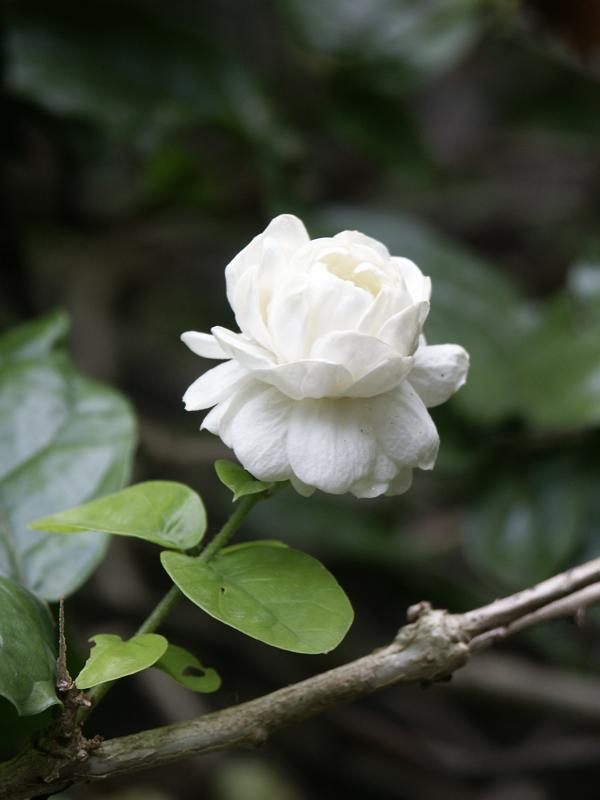
Jasminum sambac "Grand Duke of Tuscany"

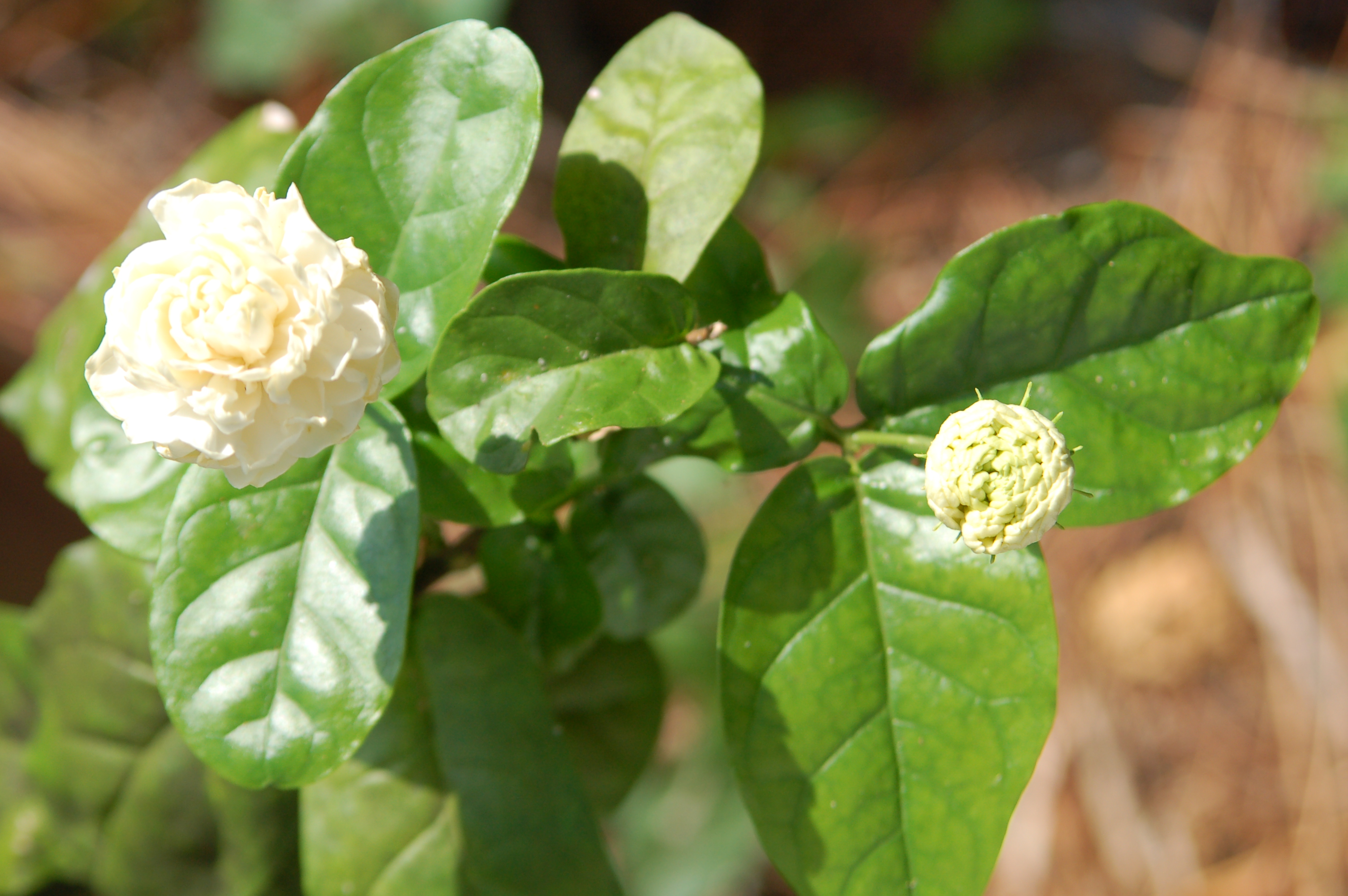
A double-flowered cultivar of Jasminum sambac in flower with an unopened bud

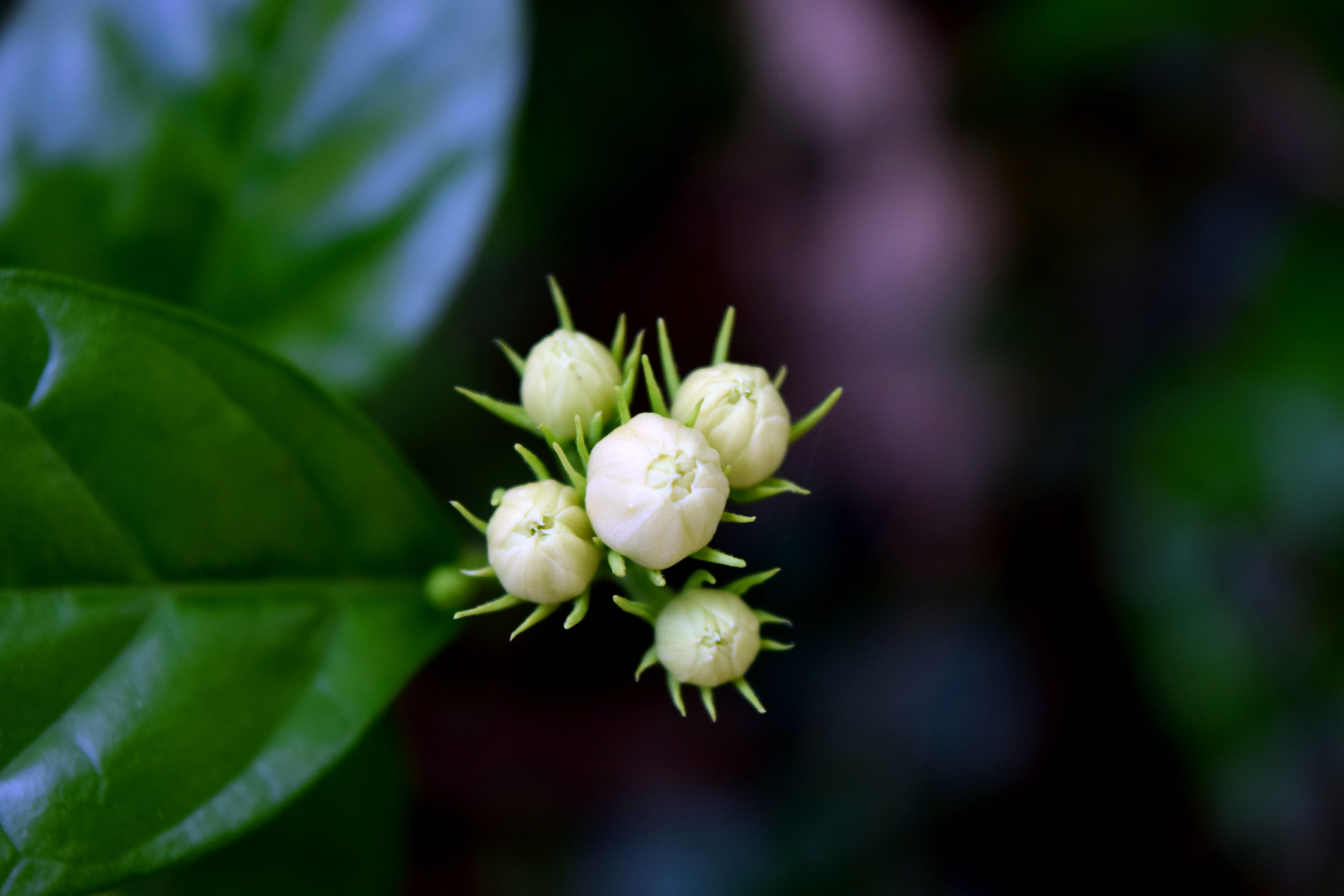
Jasmine buds

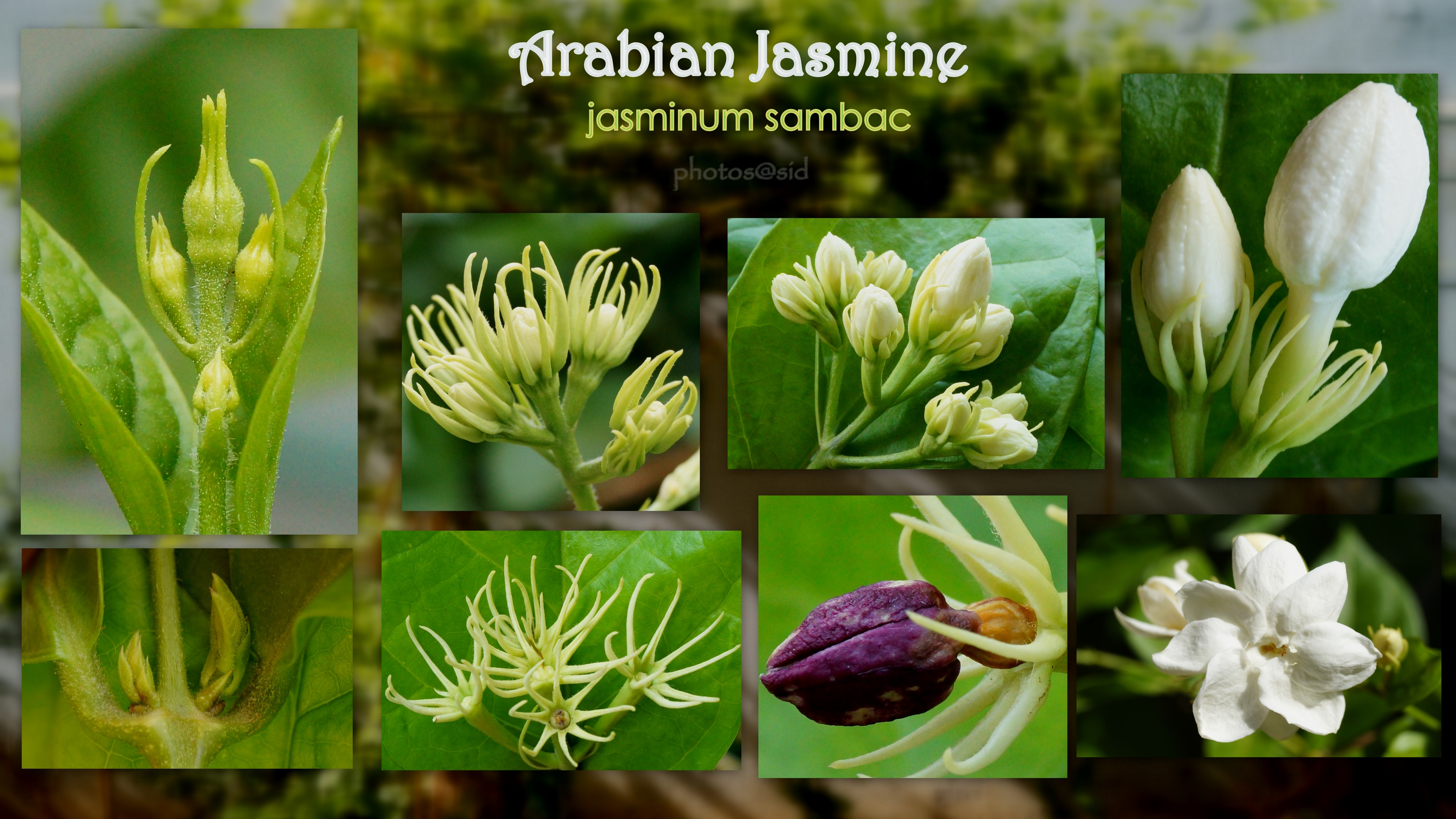
Lifecycle of Arabian jasmine flower

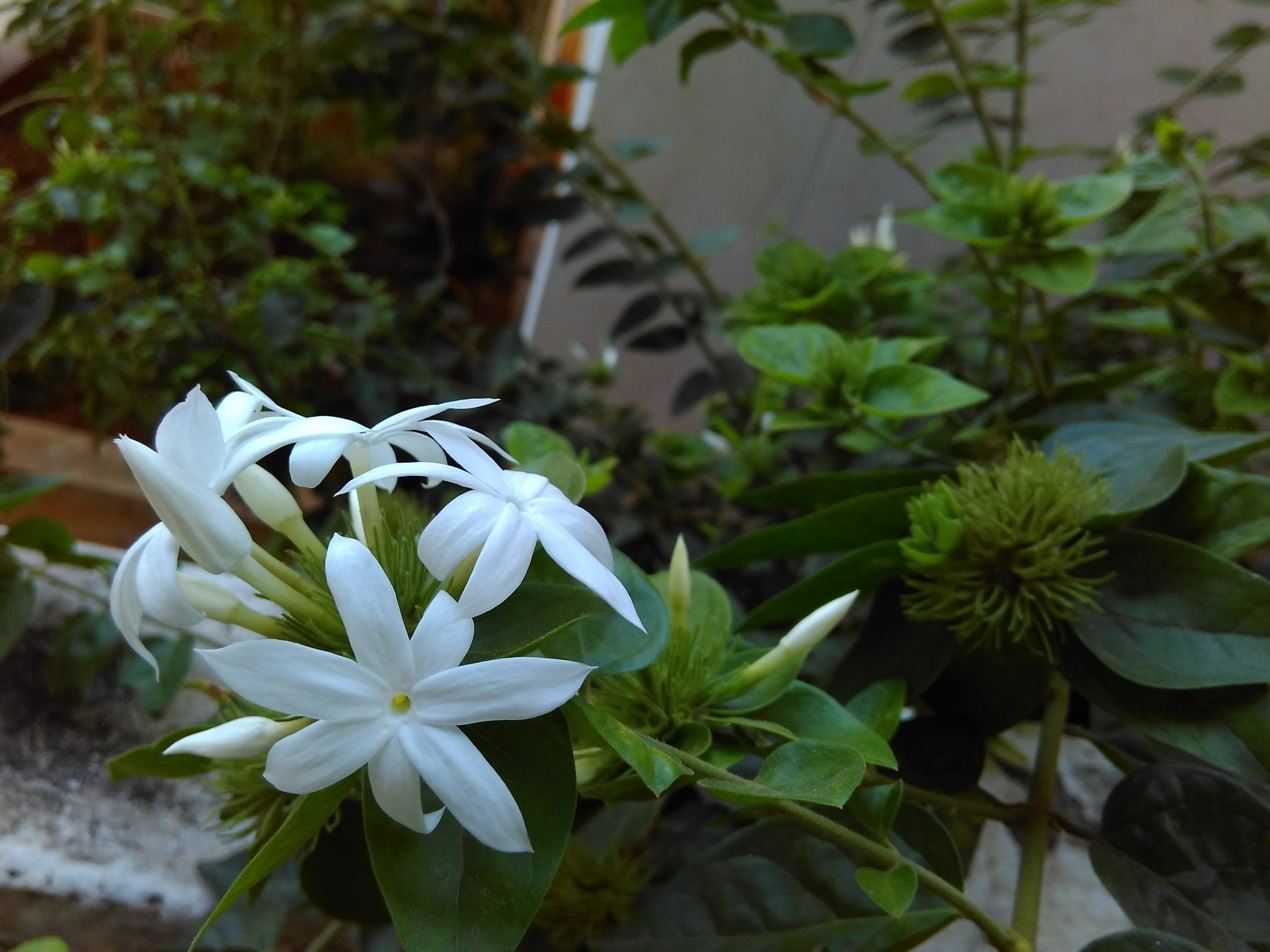
Jasmine flowers

== Jasmonates ==
Jasmine lends its name to jasmonate plant hormones, as methyl jasmonate isolated from the oil of Jasminum grandiflorum led to the discovery of the molecular structure of jasmonates. Jasmonates occur ubiquitously across the plant kingdom, having key roles in responses to environmental cues, such as heat or cold stress, and participate in the signal transduction pathways of many plants.

== Cultural importance ==
Jasmine is cultivated commercially for domestic and industrial uses, such as the perfume industry. It is used in rituals like marriages, religious ceremonies, and festivals. Jasmine flower vendors sell garlands of jasmine, or in the case of the thicker motiyaa (in Hindi) or mograa (in Marathi) varieties, bunches of jasmine are common. They may be found around entrances to temples, on major thoroughfares, and in major business areas.

A change in presidency in Tunisia in 1987 and the Tunisian Revolution of 2011 are both called "Jasmine revolutions" in reference to the flower.

"Jasmine" is a common female given name.

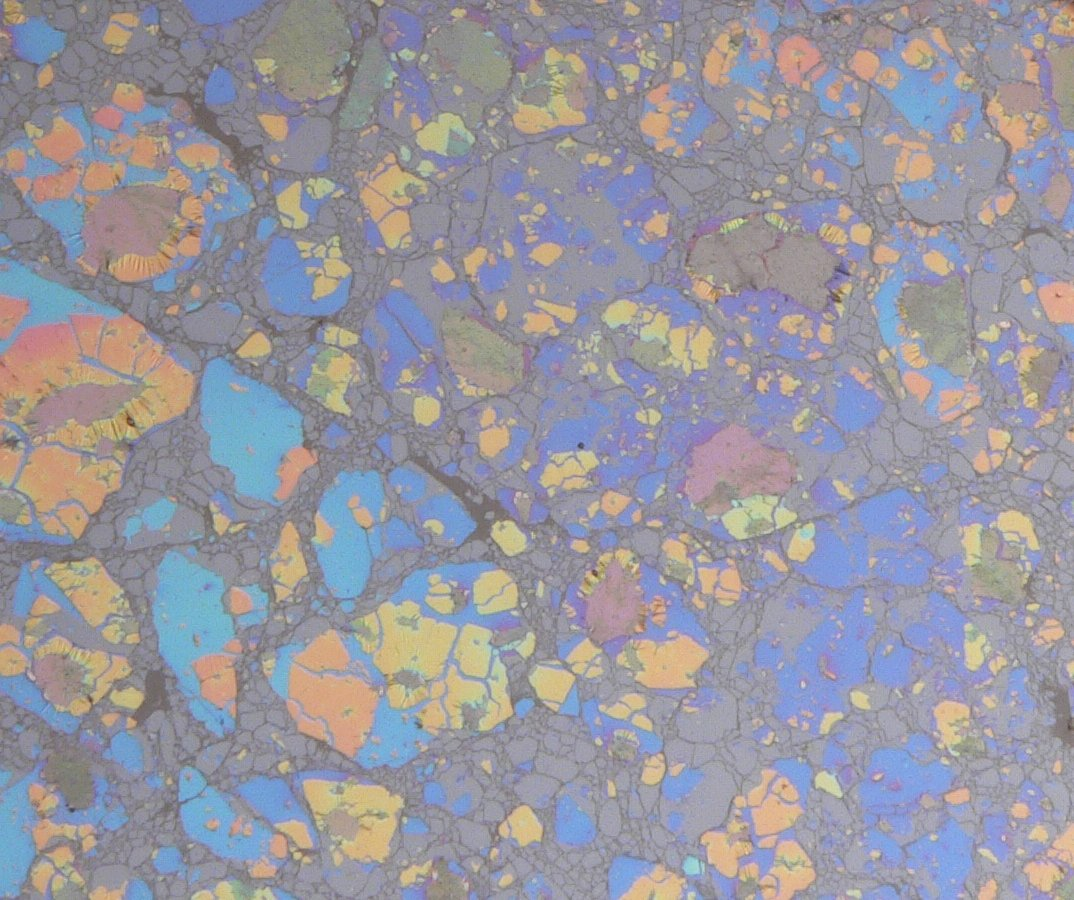
Surface of Jasmine tea

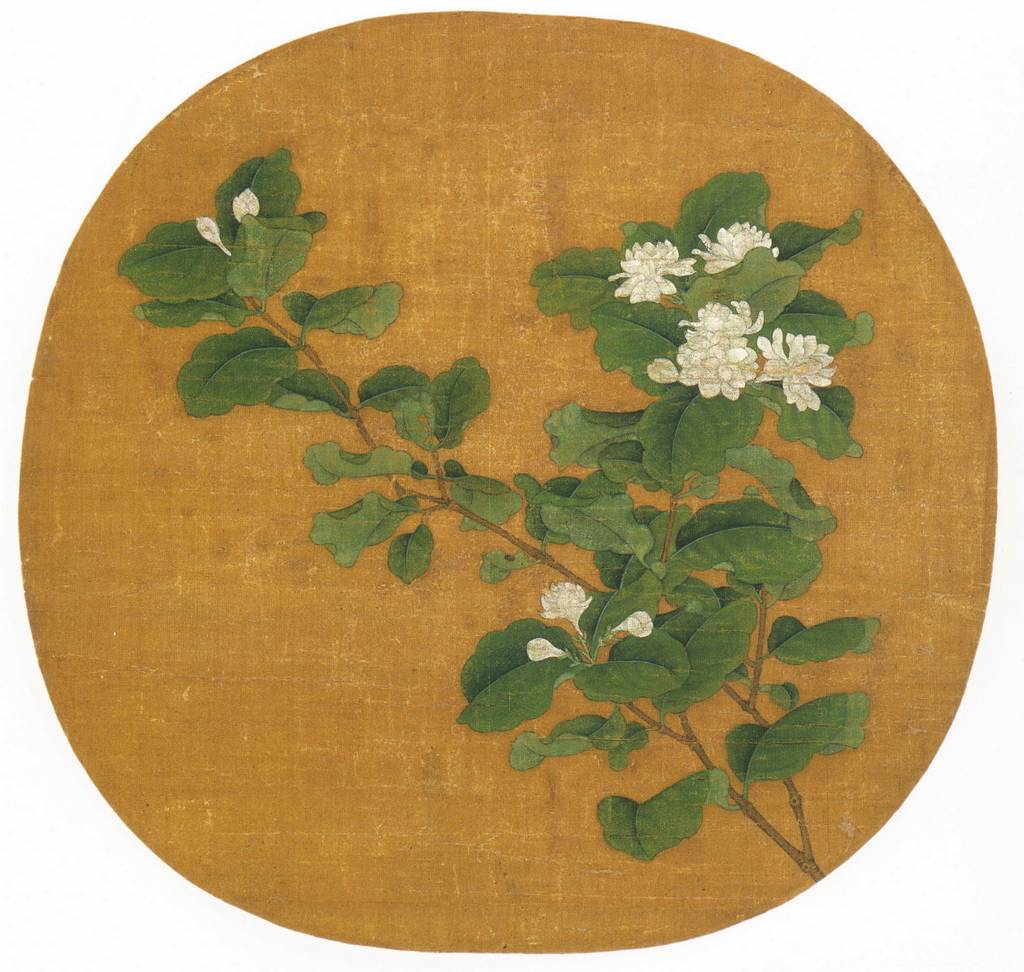
The White Jasmine Branch, painting of ink and color on silk by Chinese artist Zhao Chang, early 12th century

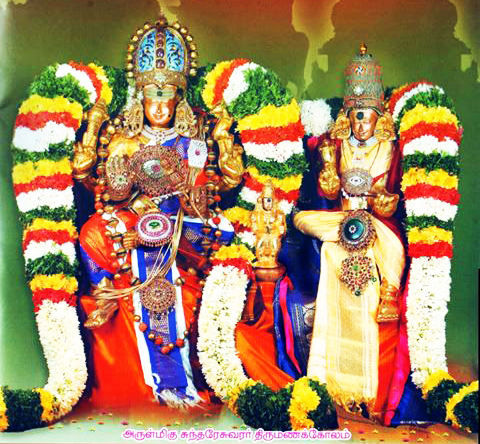
Jasmine used as garland

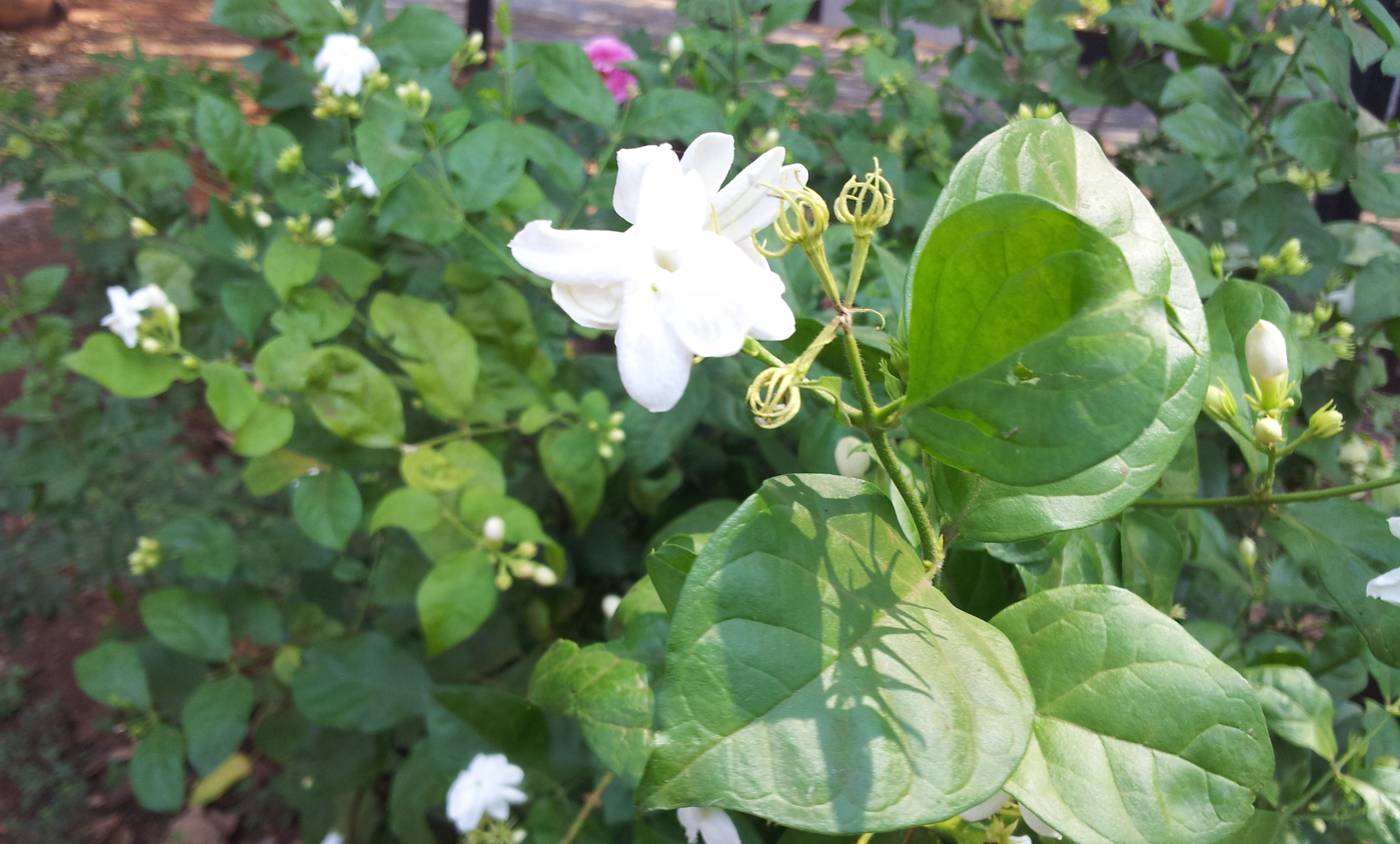
Jasmine flower blooming

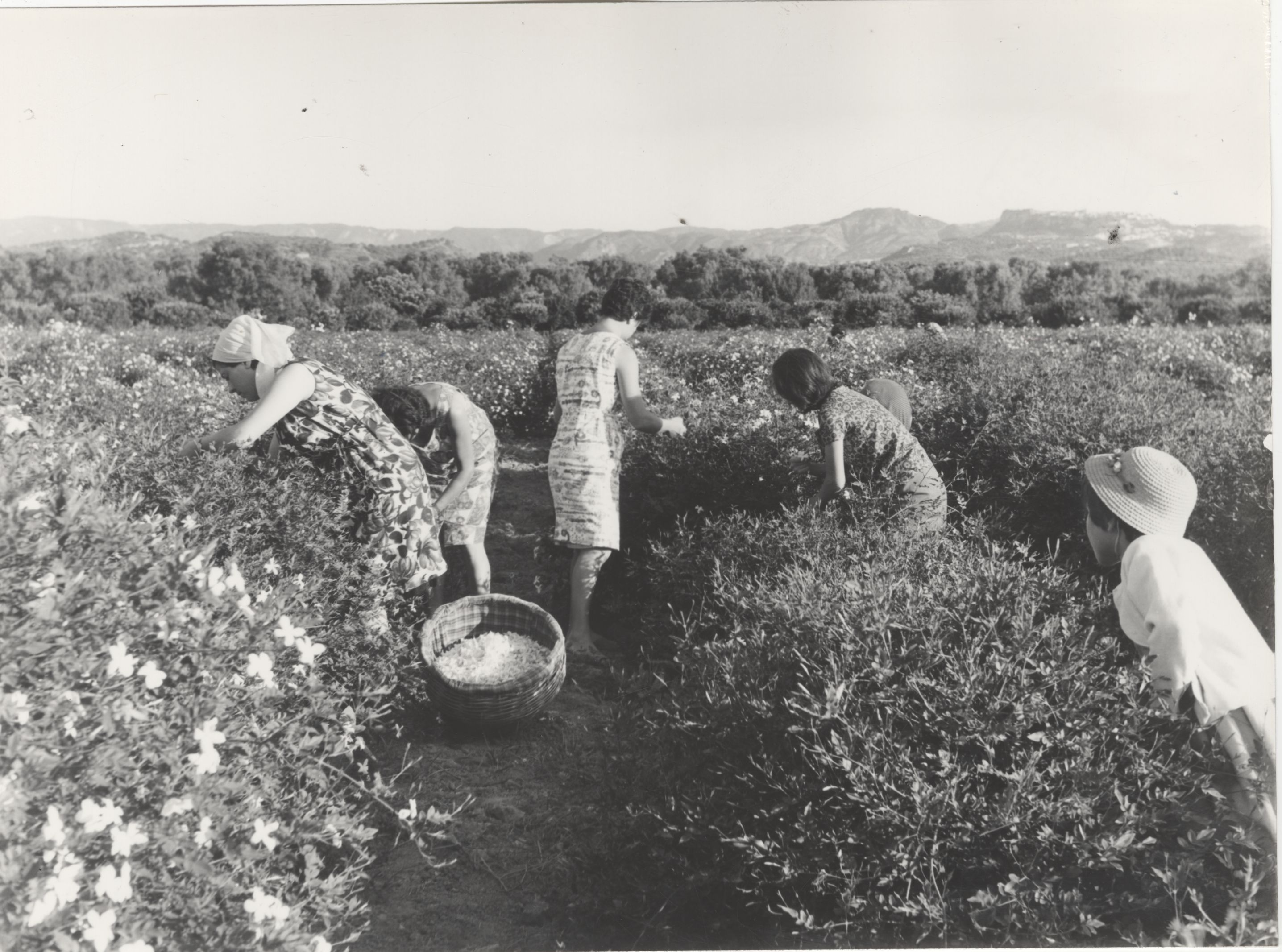
Jasmine flowers harvest in Reggio Calabria, Italy (1965)

=== Symbolism ===
Several countries and states consider jasmine as a national symbol.

- Syria: The Syrian city Damascus is called the City of Jasmine.
- Hawaii: Jasminum sambac ("pikake") is a common flower used in leis and is the subject of many Hawaiian songs.
- Indonesia: Jasminum sambac is the national flower, adopted in 1990. It goes by the name "melati putih" and is used in wedding ceremonies for ethnic Indonesians, especially on the island of Java.
- Pakistan: Jasminum officinale is known as the "chambeli" or "yasmin", it is the national flower.
- Philippines: Jasminum sambac is the national flower. Adopted in 1935, it is known as "sampaguita" in the islands. It is usually strung in garlands which are then used to adorn religious images.
- Thailand: Jasmine flowers are used as a symbol of motherhood.
- Tunisia: The national flower of Tunisia is jasmine. It was chosen as a symbol for the Tunisian Revolution.
- Iran: (and/or Shia Islam), Jasmine is considered as a symbol for Fatimah al-Zahra, the daughter of the Islam prophet Muhammad.

== Other plants called "jasmine" ==
- Brazilian jasmine Mandevilla sanderi
- Cape jasmine Gardenia
- Carolina jasmine Gelsemium sempervirens
- Crape jasmine Tabernaemontana divaricata
- Chilean jasmine Mandevilla laxa
- Jasmine rice, a type of long-grain rice
- Madagascar jasmine Stephanotis floribunda
- New Zealand jasmine Parsonsia capsularis
- Night-blooming jasmine Cestrum nocturnum
- Night-flowering jasmine Nyctanthes arbor-tristis
- Orange jasmine Murraya paniculata
- Red jasmine Plumeria rubra
- Star jasmine, Confederate jasmine Trachelospermum jasminoides
- Paraguaian jasmine Brunfelsia australis
- Tree jasmine (disambiguation)
