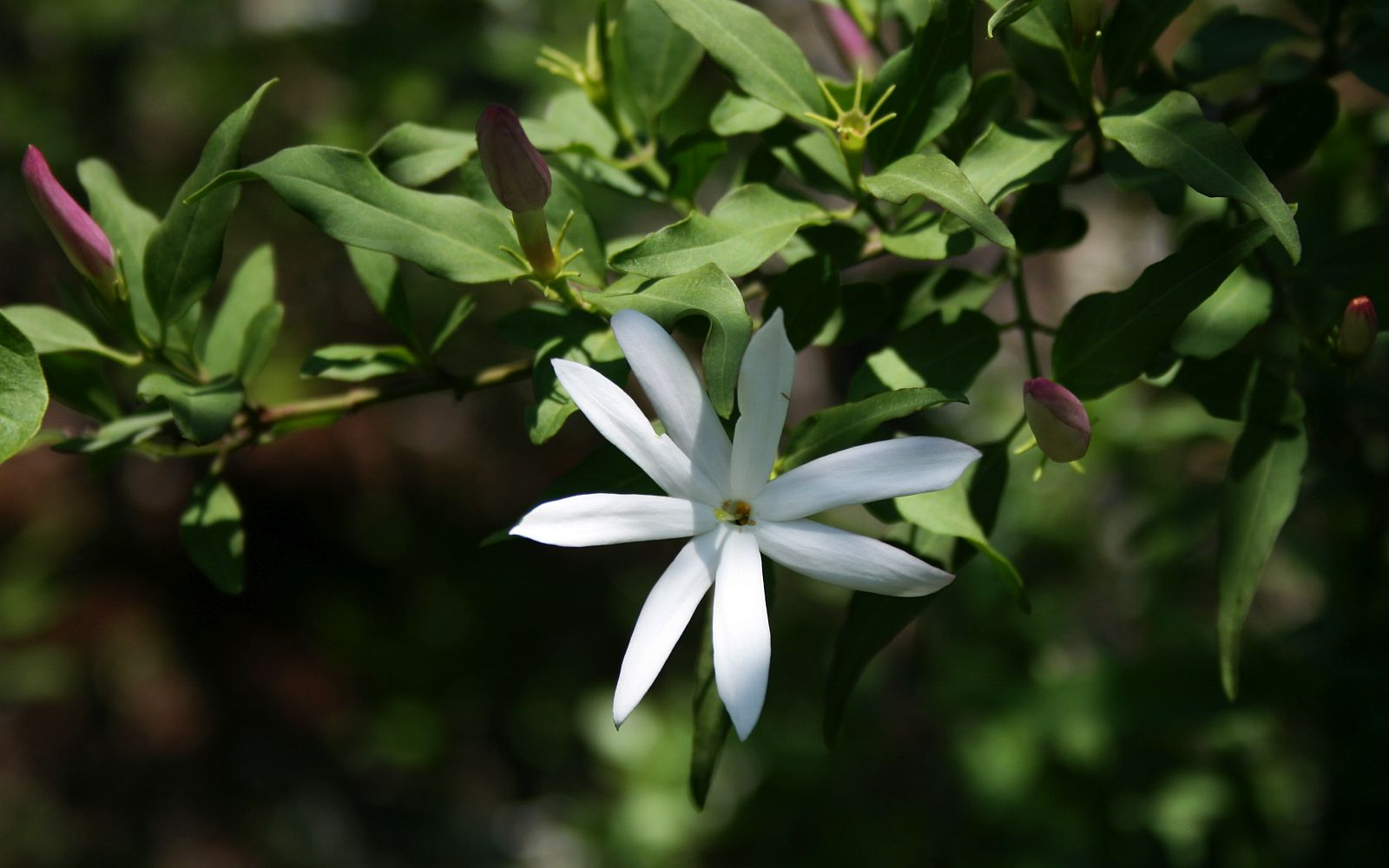

Scientific classification
- Kingdom: Plantae
- Clade: Tracheophytes
- Clade: Angiosperms
- Clade: Eudicots
- Clade: Asterids
- Order: Lamiales
- Family: Oleaceae
- Genus: Jasminum
- Species: J. multipartitum

Binomial name
- Jasminum multipartitum Hochst.

Synonyms
- Jasminum glaucum var. parviflorum E.Mey.; Jasminum oleicarpum Baker

= Jasminum multipartitum =

Species of vine

Jasminum multipartitum, the starry wild jasmine, African jasmine, or imfohlafohlane, is a species of jasmine, in the family Oleaceae, that is native to Southern Africa.

== Description ==
This 3-metre-tall (9.8 ft) scrambling climber, that can also be grown as a 1.5-metre-tall (4.9 ft) shrub, thrives in the sun or semi-shade. It produces masses of white, scented, star-shaped flowers and it attracts a variety of birds. It flowers from late spring to summer.

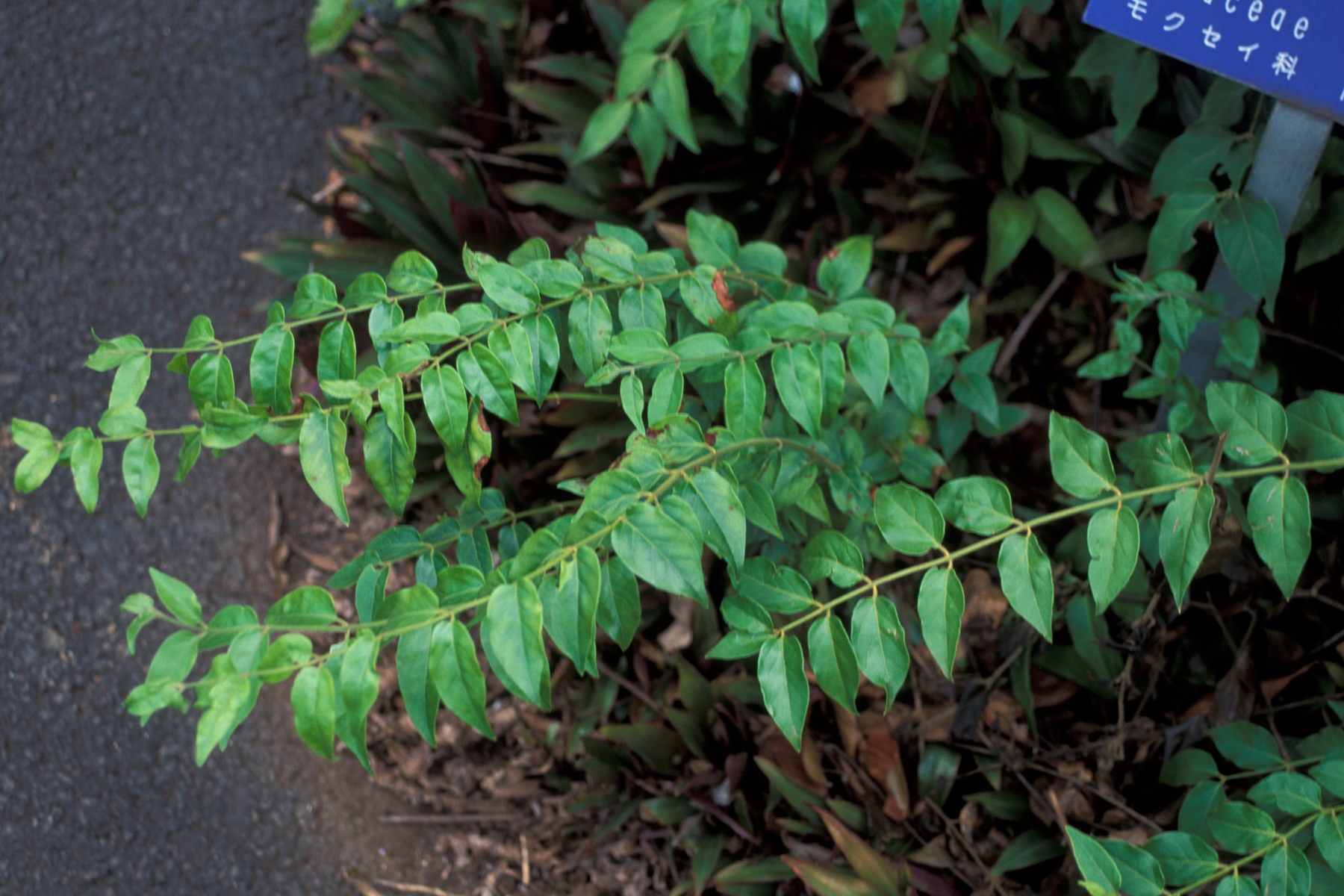
Leaves

== Distribution ==
This is one of approximately ten species of Jasmine that occur in South Africa. Native to Mozambique, Zimbabwe, Eswatini and South Africa, Starry Wild Jasmine is naturally found in the woodlands of the Eastern Cape and Kwazulu Natal, as well as inland as far as Johannesburg.

== Etymology ==
'Jasminum' is a Latinized form of the Persian word, 'yasemin' for sweetly scented plants.

Latin species name multipartitus means divided into several or many parts, referring to the shape of the flower; it comes from multi- + partitus, past participle of partire 'to divide', from part-, pars 'part'.
