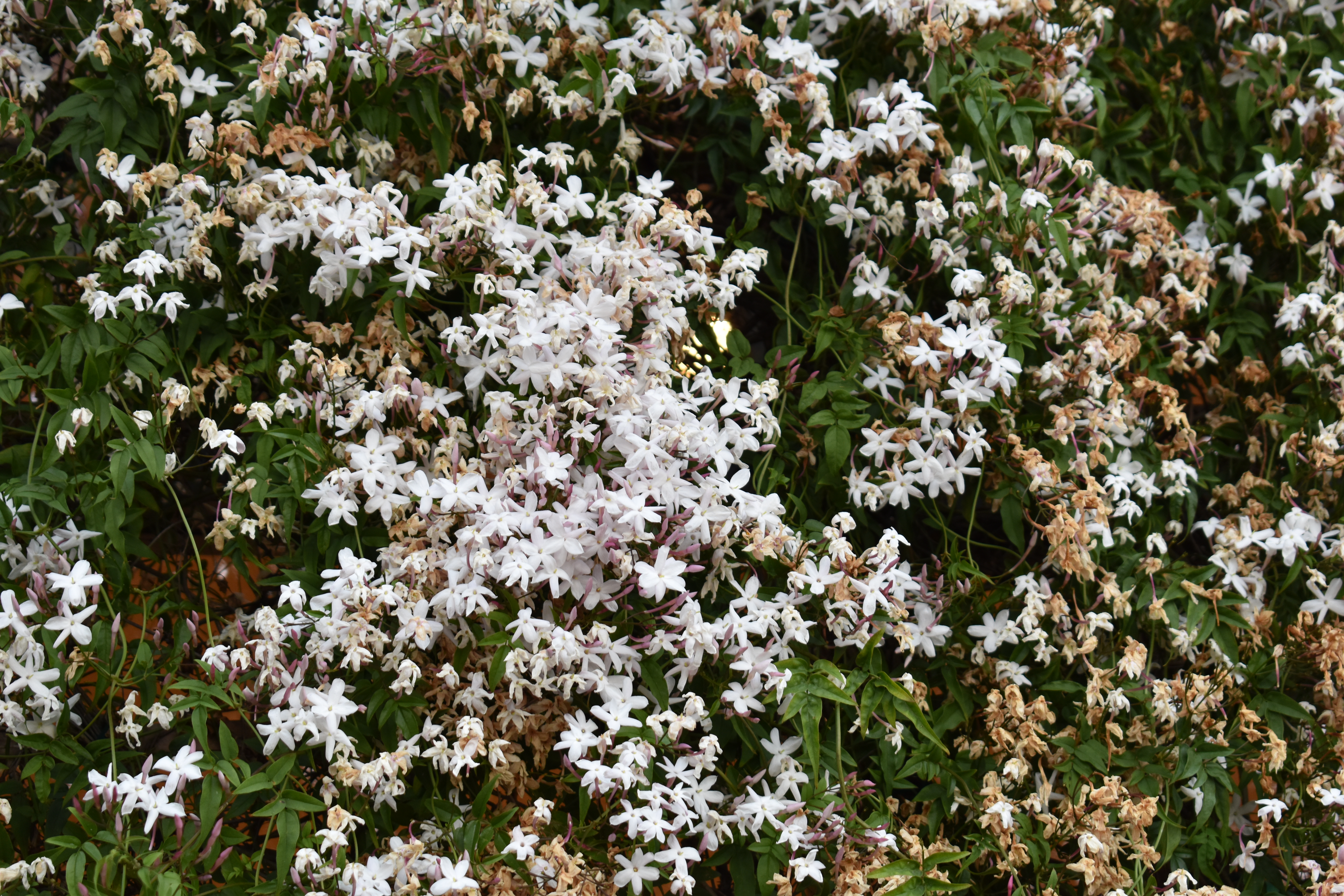
- Specimen in 2017

Scientific classification
- Kingdom: Plantae
- Clade: Tracheophytes
- Clade: Angiosperms
- Clade: Eudicots
- Clade: Asterids
- Order: Lamiales
- Family: Oleaceae
- Genus: Jasminum
- Species: J. abyssinicum

Binomial name
- Jasminum abyssinicum Hochst. ex DC.

Synonyms
- Jasminum butaguense De Wild.; Jasminum fraseri Brenan; Jasminum mearnsii De Wild.; Jasminum rutshuruense De Wild.; Jasminum ruwenzoriense De Wild.; Jasminum wittei Staner; Jasminum wyliei N.E.Br.

= Jasminum abyssinicum =

Forest jasmine

Species of plant

Jasminium abyssinicum (forest jasmine) is a species of jasmine, in the family Oleaceae.

Jasminum abyssinicum is a strong to slender woody climber in high-altitude montane forests, climbing into the forest canopy with stems that can be robust up to 13 cm in diameter. The leaves are opposite, trifoliolate; leaflets are broadly ovate with a distinct driptip, dark glossy green above, hairless except for pockets of hairs in the axils of the leaves. The flowers are produced at the ends twigs or in axils of leaves. The flowers are white, tinged with pink on the outside, sweetly scented with a corolla with 5 or sometimes 6 elliptic lobes. The fruits are a single- or bi-lobed berry 7 mm long, fleshy, glossy black.

Jasminum abyssinicum is native to Africa from Ethiopia to KwaZulu-Natal, South Africa. It has been reported from Burundi, Cameroon, Rwanda, Congo-Kinshasa, Eritrea, Ethiopia, Kenya, Uganda, Malawi, Mozambique, Zambia, Zimbabwe, Natal and Transvaal.

== Etymology ==
'Jasminum' is a Latinized form of the Persian word, 'yasemin' for sweetly scented plants.

== Uses ==
The Maasai people of Kenya use this plant as a medicinal remedy for wounds. In sheep, it is traditionally used as a treatment for the parasitic nematode Hemonchus contortus.
