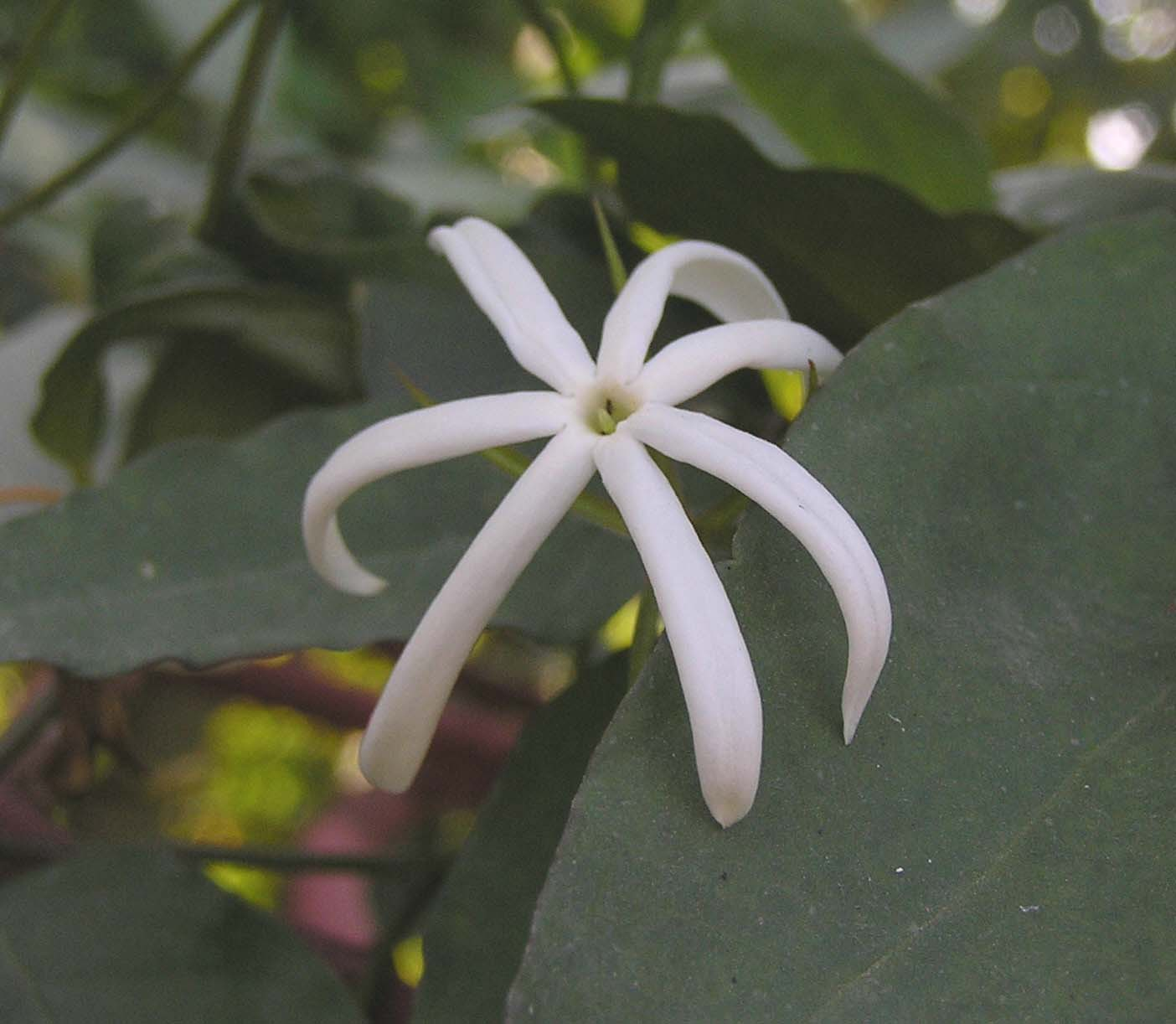

Scientific classification
- Kingdom: Plantae
- Clade: Tracheophytes
- Clade: Angiosperms
- Clade: Eudicots
- Clade: Asterids
- Order: Lamiales
- Family: Oleaceae
- Genus: Jasminum
- Species: J. adenophyllum

Binomial name
- Jasminum adenophyllum Wall. ex. C.B.Clarke
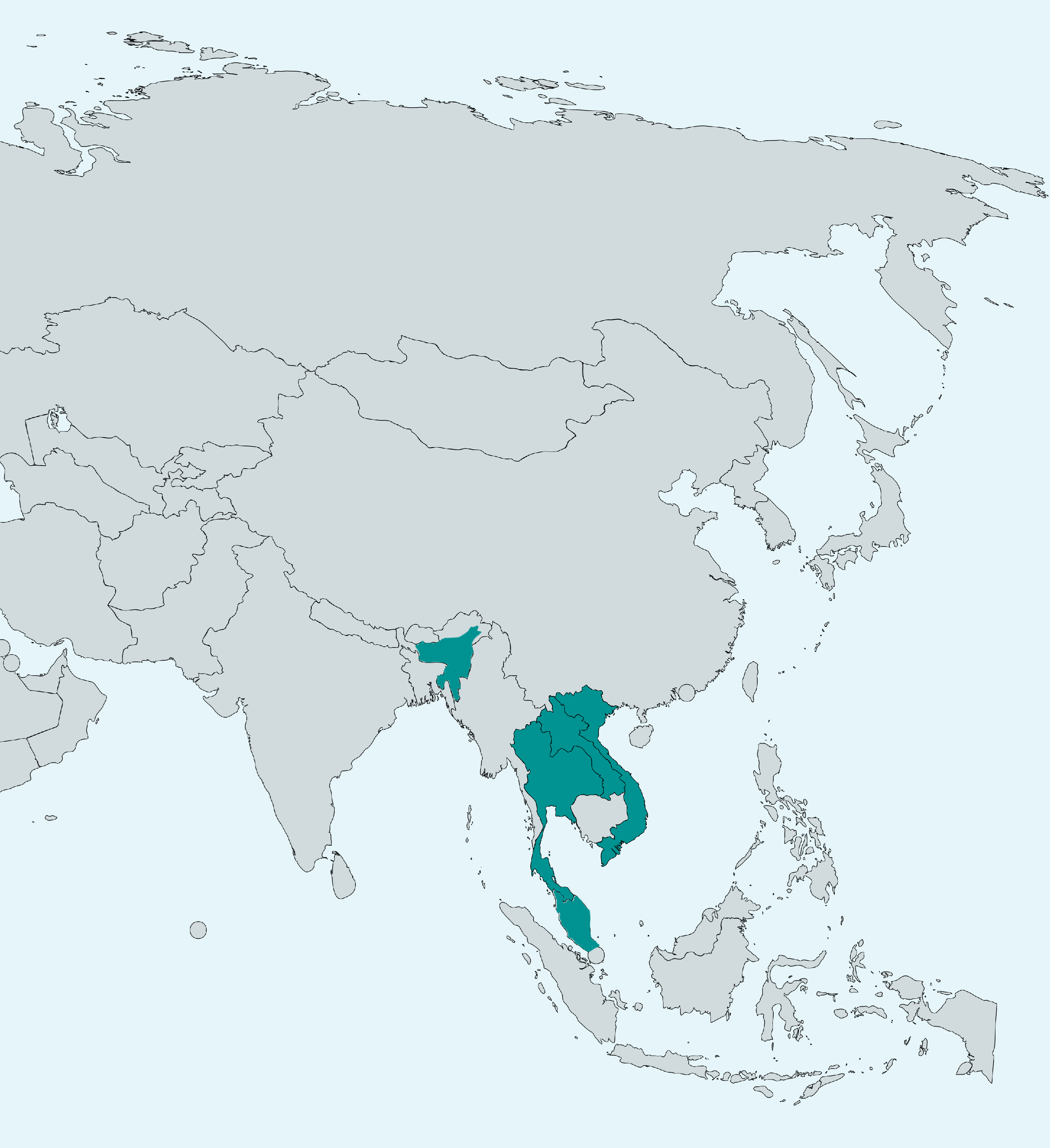
- Jasminum adenophyllum range

Synonyms
- Jasminum malayanum Kiew Jasminum trangense Kerr

= Jasminum adenophyllum =

Species of jasmine

Jasminum adenophyllum, commonly known as the bluegrape jasmine, pinwheel jasmine, or princess jasmine, is a species of jasmine, belonging to the olive family.

== Distribution and habitat ==
The bluegrape jasmine is a relatively rare species of jasmine mostly found in parts of northeast India (especially Assam and Meghalaya), but also discovered in Laos, Malaysia, Thailand and Vietnam.

== Description ==
The bluegrape jasmine is a fast-growing climbing vine, but can also grow as ground cover. It is a tropical plant. It has dark green, glossy leaves of length 5–7 cm (1.9–2.8 in), and bears grape-sized blue-black berries which attract birds. The species produces large white flowers, typically having narrow, curled petals. They are very fragrant and attractive to bees and butterflies.
