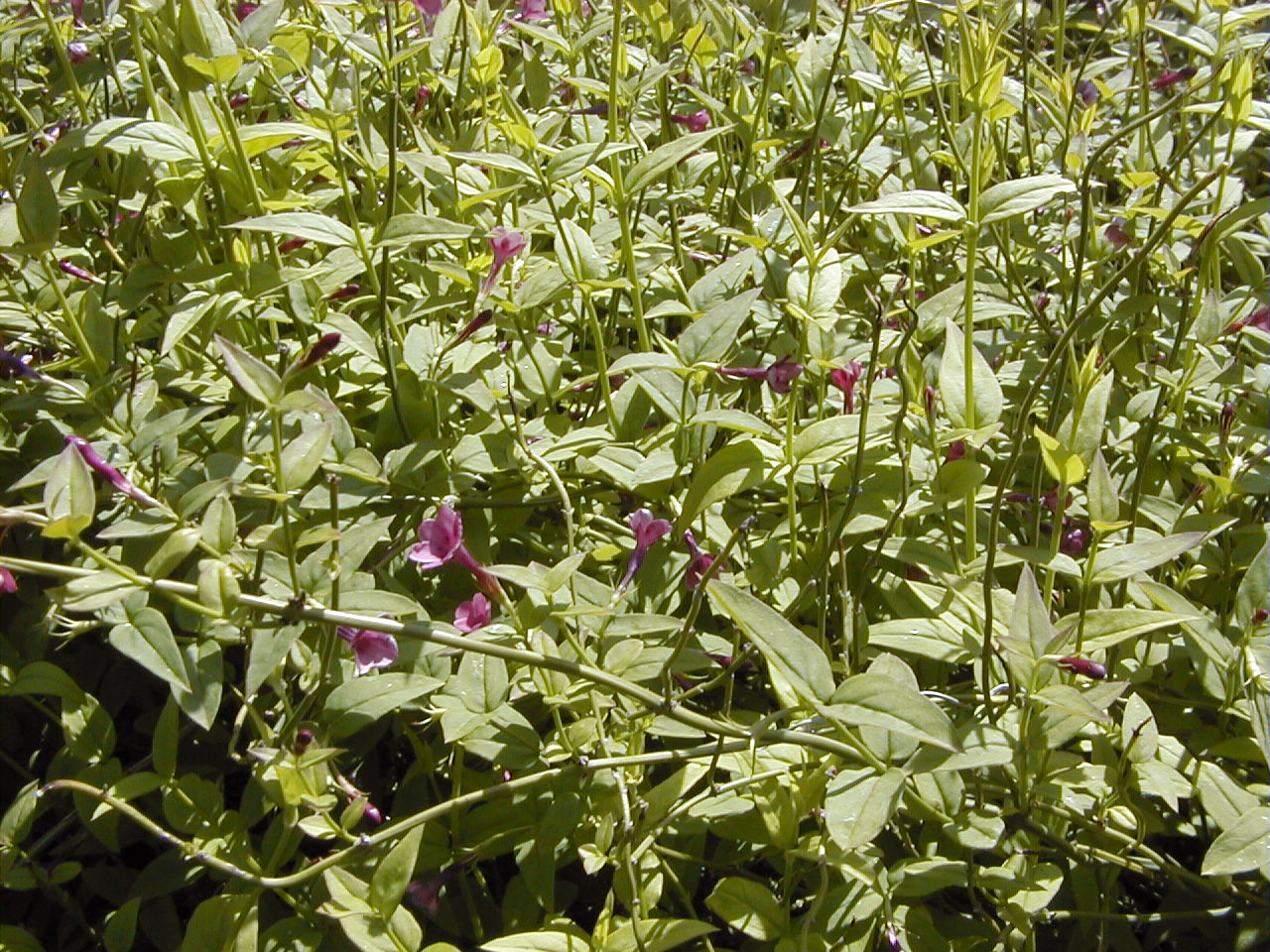

Scientific classification
- Kingdom: Plantae
- Clade: Tracheophytes
- Clade: Angiosperms
- Clade: Eudicots
- Clade: Asterids
- Order: Lamiales
- Family: Oleaceae
- Genus: Jasminum
- Species: J. beesianum

Binomial name
- Jasminum beesianum (L.) Forrest.

= Jasminum beesianum =

Species of plant

Jasminum beesianum, also known as red jasmine or Beesianum jasmine, is a flowering plant species in the family Oleaceae. The flowers of the plant are very colorful, ranging from pink-red to red (or sometimes rosy crimson). While many species in the genus Jasminum are multi-colored, Jasminum beesianum is much more specific in color; they only produce red or pink flowers. Additionally, a slight sweet fragrance comes from the flowers. Jasminum beesianum is native to southeastern Tibet and central China.

== Description ==
Jasminum beesianum is a true jasmine species with small but noticeable flowers. This species produces fruit: small, glossy black berries in the winter. The height of the plant itself can grow to 2.5-4.5 m, but can stretch farther than that with age and support. The spread can reach 1.2-2.5 m, also relying on training and support. The flower shapes are star and tubular; the petals/rays are 6 in number. Jasminum beesianum is a woody twining climber, meaning it has the ability to grow ("climb") with a structure, such as a trellis, pergola, arch, or sheltered fence. The plant is not a tiny accent vine like many might think; it's actually a moderate climber. Jasminum beesianum is often favored by gardeners for its color, size, and romantic, appeasing look.

== Distribution and habitat ==
Jasminum beesianum is native to southeastern Tibet and central China, but also found in the mountainous regions of Yunnan and Sichuan. This is a similar location to its fellow species in the genus Jasminum. Jasminum beesianum is mainly found in slopes, thickets, and woods near 1,006-3,658 m in elevation. The species enjoys soil textures like clay, high organic matter, and sand.

== Uses ==
The main use of Jasminum beesianum is for landscaping and garden design. All parts of the plant are non-toxic to pets like dogs and cats, but should not be considered edible just because it is non-toxic.
