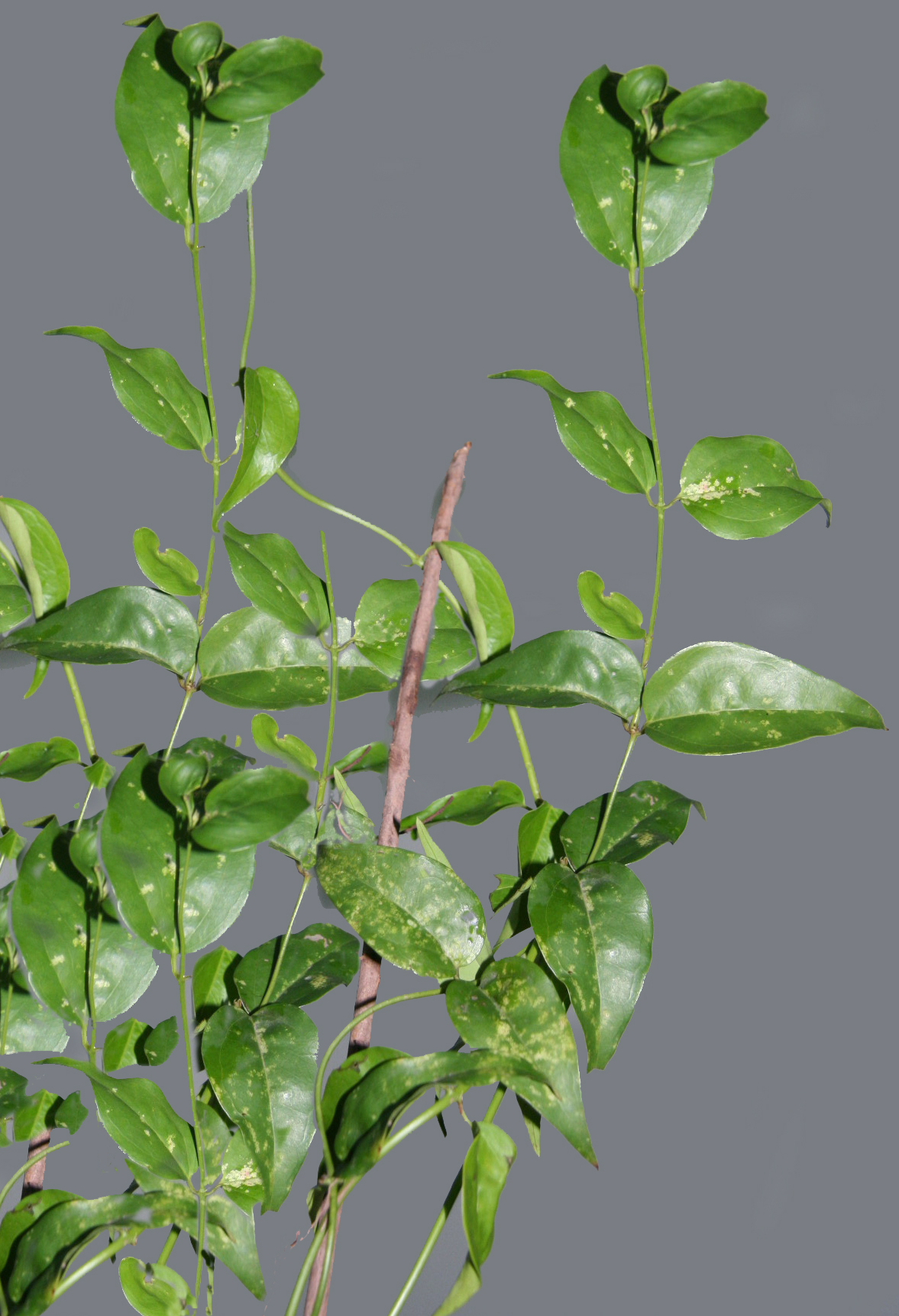
- Jasminum nervosum in Vietnam

Scientific classification
- Kingdom: Plantae
- Clade: Tracheophytes
- Clade: Angiosperms
- Clade: Eudicots
- Clade: Asterids
- Order: Lamiales
- Family: Oleaceae
- Genus: Jasminum
- Species: J. nervosum

Binomial name
- Jasminum nervosum Lour.

Synonyms
- List: Jasminum amplexicaule var. elegans (Hemsl.) Kobuski; Jasminum anastomosans Wall. ex DC.; Jasminum anastomosans var. silhetense (Blume) C.B.Clarke; Jasminum cinnamomifolium var. axillare Kobuski; Jasminum elegans (Hemsl.) Yamam.; Jasminum finlaysonianum Wall. ex G.Don; Jasminum hemsleyi Yamam.; Jasminum laurifolium var. villosum H.Lév.; Jasminum lindleyanum Blume; Jasminum nervosum var. elegans (Hemsl.) L.C.Chia; Jasminum nervosum var. villosum (H.Lév.) L.C.Chia; Jasminum silhetense Blume; Jasminum smalianum Brandis; Jasminum stenopetalum Lindl.; Jasminum subtriplinerve Blume; Jasminum subtriplinerve var. parvifolium Regel; Jasminum trinerve Roxb.; Jasminum trineuron Kobuski; Jasminum undulatum var. elegans Hemsl.

= Jasminum nervosum =

Species of jasmine

Jasminum nervosum is a species of flowering plant in the family Oleaceae. The leaves of this jasmine are used as a medicinal drink in Vietnam.

== Distribution ==
It is native to Assam, Bangladesh, Cambodia, South-Central and Southeast China, East Himalaya, Hainan, Laos, Malaysia, Myanmar, Taiwan, Thailand, Tibet, and Vietnam.
