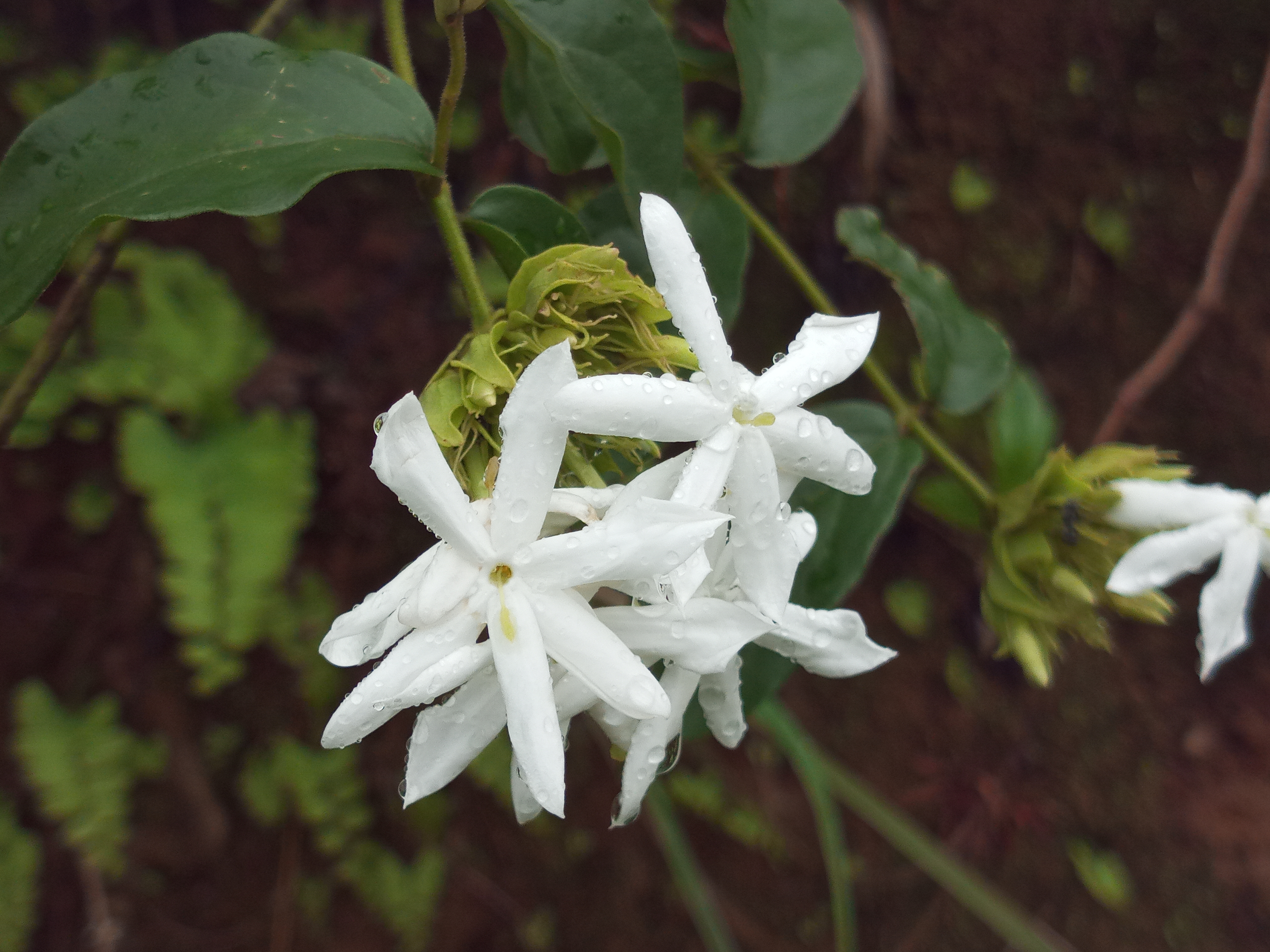
- In Kerala, India

Scientific classification
- Kingdom: Plantae
- Clade: Tracheophytes
- Clade: Angiosperms
- Clade: Eudicots
- Clade: Asterids
- Order: Lamiales
- Family: Oleaceae
- Genus: Jasminum
- Species: J. angustifolium

Binomial name
- Jasminum angustifolium (L.) Willd.

Synonyms
- Nyctanthes angustifolia L.

= Jasminum angustifolium =

Wild jasmine

Species of shrub

Jasminum angustifolium, the wild jasmine, is a species of jasmine native to Sri Lanka and India, including the Andaman Islands. It is a climbing shrub with a smooth stem and minutely pubescent branchlets. It grows up to 6 m (20 ft) tall. Leaves are dark green and opposite in arrangement. The flowers are approximately 25 mm (1 in) in diameter, and resemble a star with seven or eight narrow petals, flowering between June and August.

Its flowers are used as sacred floral offerings and perfumes. The root of the plant is also used for medicinal properties.

== Etymology ==
'Jasminum' is a Latinized form of the Persian word 'yasemin', for sweetly scented plants.
