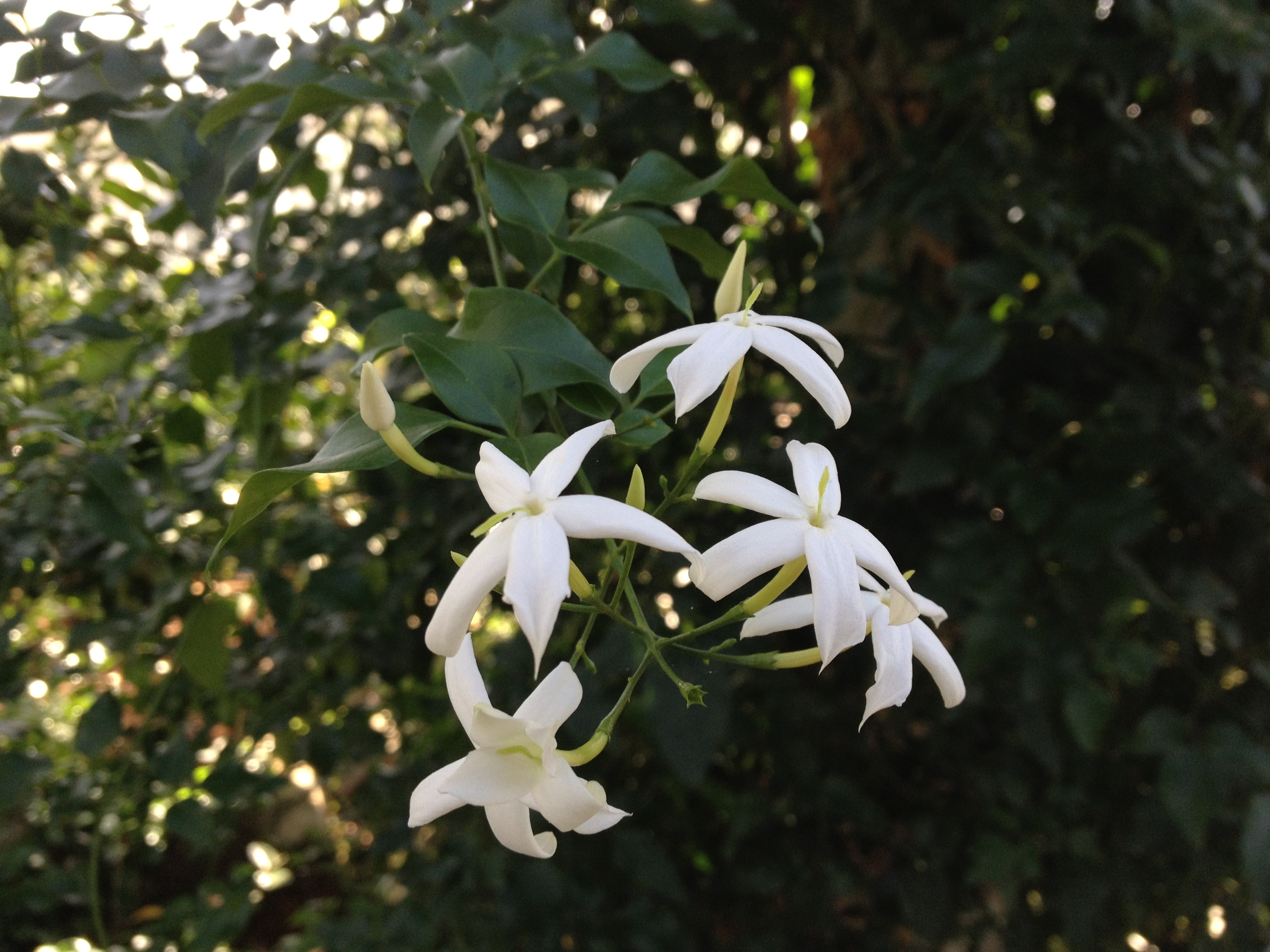
- Jasminum tortuosum in the Temperate House at the Royal Botanic Gardens, Kew

Scientific classification
- Kingdom: Plantae
- Clade: Tracheophytes
- Clade: Angiosperms
- Clade: Eudicots
- Clade: Asterids
- Order: Lamiales
- Family: Oleaceae
- Genus: Jasminum
- Species: J. tortuosum

Binomial name
- Jasminum tortuosum Willd.

Synonyms
- J. flexile (sensu) Jacq. non Vahl.; J. tortuosum var. campanulatum (Link) DC.; J. tortuosum var. latifolium Vis.

= Jasminum tortuosum =

Species of jasmine

Jasminum tortuosum is a species of jasmine native to South Africa. It is generally found twining high into the trees of forests in southwestern part of Cape Province, but also may scramble where there is little vertical space. It has angular branches off its main stem, and its flowers usually have five white petals each. The specific epithet (tortuosum) is from Latin, describing something that is winding or very twisted.

== Etymology ==
'Jasminum' is a Latinized form of the Arabic word, 'yasemin' for sweetly scented plants.

'Tortuosum' is the possessive form os 'tortus', meaning 'complex', 'meandering', or 'winding'; this is a reference to the twining of its stems.

== Gallery ==
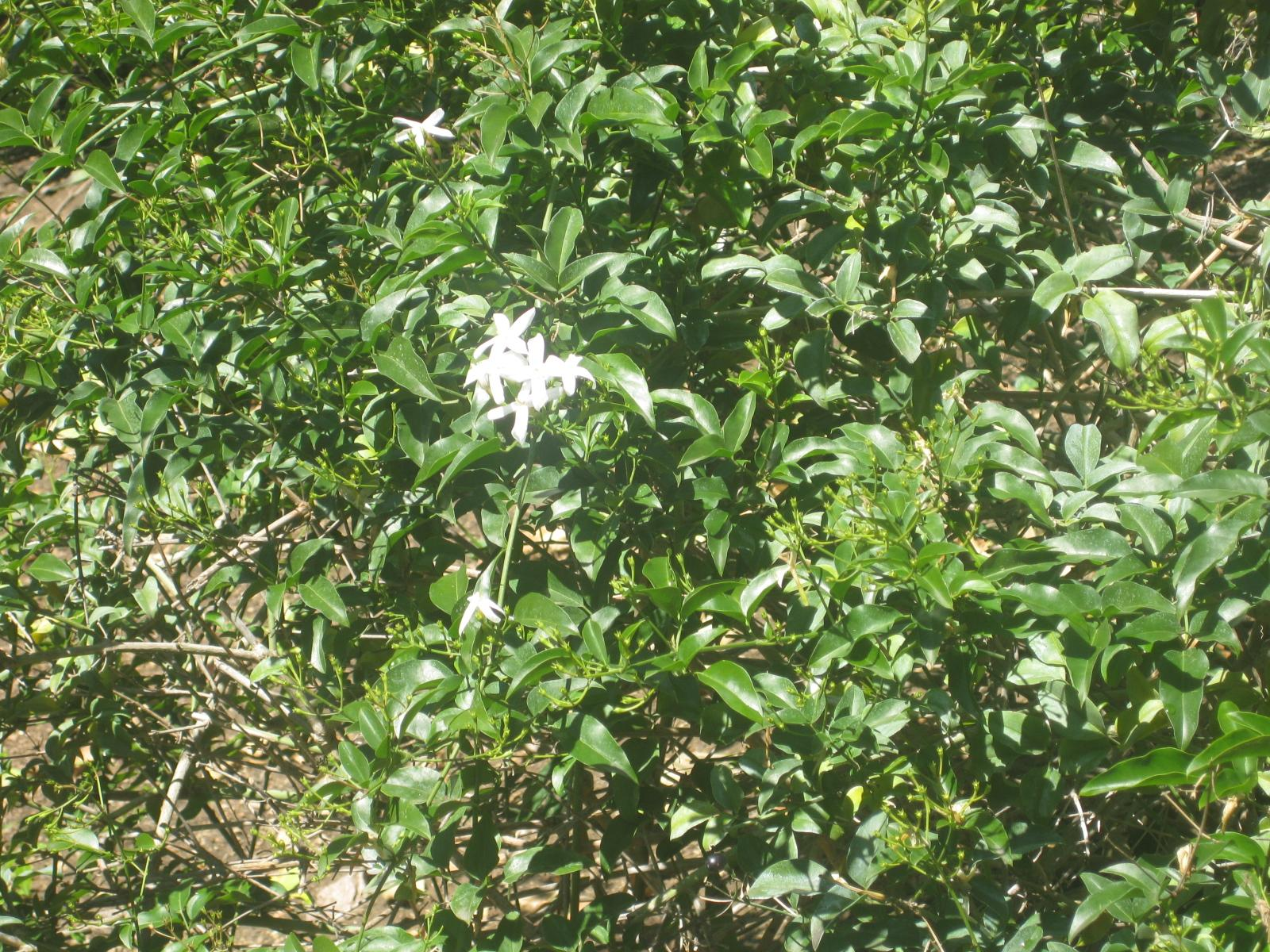
J. tortuosum growing in Huntington Desert Garden in California

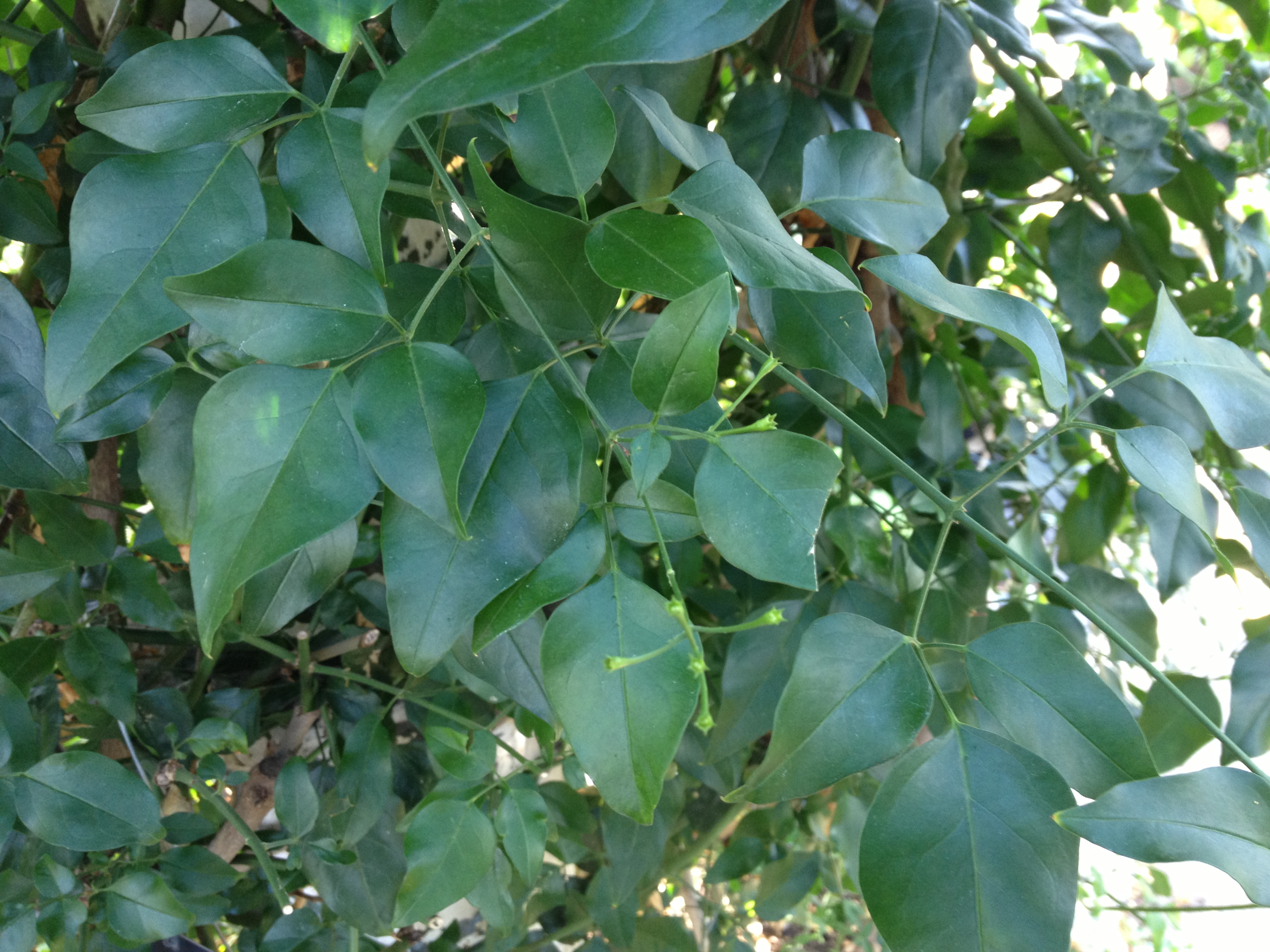
J. tortuosum foliage
