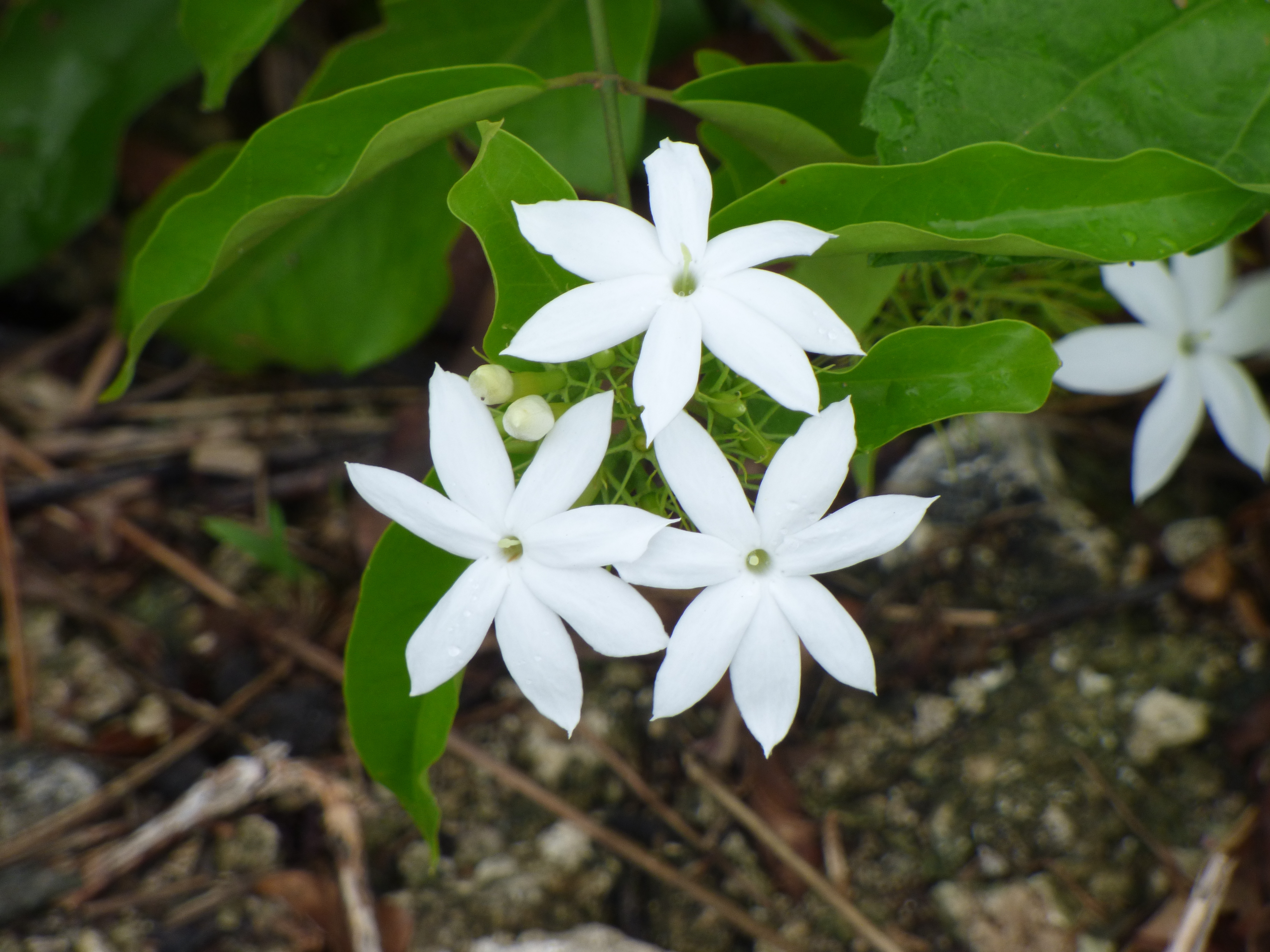

Scientific classification
- Kingdom: Plantae
- Clade: Tracheophytes
- Clade: Angiosperms
- Clade: Eudicots
- Clade: Asterids
- Order: Lamiales
- Family: Oleaceae
- Genus: Jasminum
- Species: J. elongatum

Binomial name
- Jasminum elongatum (Bergius) Willd.

Synonyms
- Basionym: Nyctanthes elongata P.J.Bergius; Homotypic: Mogorium elongatum (P.J.Bergius) Lam.; Heterotypic: Jasminum acuminatissimum Blume; Jasminum aemulum R.Br.; Jasminum aemulum f. glabrum (C.B.Clarke) Kobuski; Jasminum aemulum f. interstans Domin; Jasminum aemulum var. brassii P.S.Green; Jasminum aemulum var. genuinum Domin, nom. inval.; Jasminum aemulum var. glaberrimum Domin; Jasminum affine Blume, nom. illeg.; Jasminum amplexicaule Buch.-Ham. ex Wall. & G.Don; Jasminum arenarium Ridl.; Jasminum aristatum Wall., nom. nud.; Jasminum aristatum Zipp. ex Span., pro syn.; Jasminum bifarium Wall. & G.Don; Jasminum bifarium var. glabrum C.B.Clarke; Jasminum bracteatum Roxb.; Jasminum coarctatum var. caudatifolium P.Y.Pai; Jasminum cordifolium subsp. andamanicum S.K.Srivast. & S.L.Kapoor; Jasminum distichum Blume; Jasminum ensatum Blume; Jasminum esquirolii H.Lév.; Jasminum evansii Ridl.; Jasminum forstenii Blume; Jasminum forstenii var. ensatum (Blume) Miq.; Jasminum fraternum Miq.; Jasminum fulvum Blume; Jasminum gibbsiae Ridl.; Jasminum glabriusculum Blume; Jasminum glabrum Willd. ex Link; Jasminum heteropleurum Blume; Jasminum horsfieldii Miq.; Jasminum lancifolium Decne.; Jasminum lessertianum A.DC.; Jasminum ligustrinum Blume; Jasminum ligustroides L.C.Chia; Jasminum mixtinervium Blume; Jasminum multiflorum f. acuminatissimum (Blume) Bakh.f. Jasminum multiflorum f. glabriusculum; (Blume) Bakh.f. Jasminum multiflorum f. subelongatum; (Blume) Bakh.f. Jasminum multinervium; Blume Jasminum nummularoides; Blume Jasminum pedale; Blume Jasminum pendulum; Blume Jasminum pubescens var. bracteatum; (Roxb.) C.B.Clarke Jasminum quinquenervium; Blume Jasminum scandens; Griff. Jasminum subelongatum; Blume Jasminum subpubescens; Blume Jasminum tonkinense; Gagnep. Jasminum triandrum; C.E.C.Fisch. Jasminum undulatum; Ker Gawl., nom. illeg. non Willd. Jasminum vulcanicum; Blume

= Jasminum elongatum =

Species of shrub

Jasminum elongatum is a species of flowering plant in the family Oleaceae.

This scrambling evergreen shrub can be grown in the sun or semi-shade. It has pinnate leaves and masses of white, strongly-scented, star-shaped flowers. This is one of native species of jasmine that naturally occur in East Asia. Vine stem diameters to 4 cm recorded. It usually grows as a vine but can flower and fruit as a shrub.
