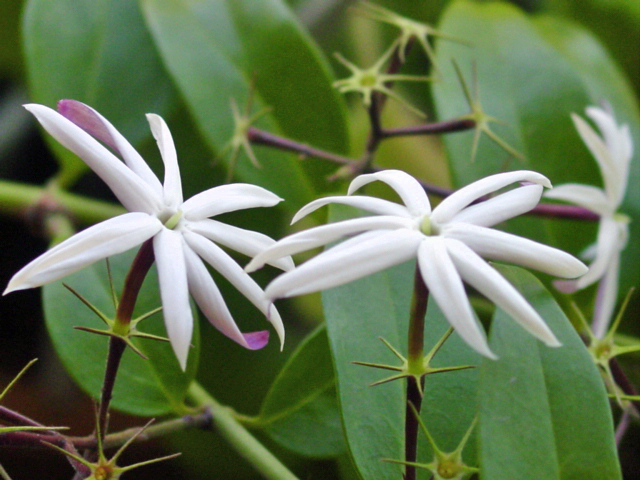
- Flowers

Scientific classification
- Kingdom: Plantae
- Clade: Embryophytes
- Clade: Tracheophytes
- Clade: Angiosperms
- Clade: Eudicots
- Clade: Asterids
- Order: Lamiales
- Family: Oleaceae
- Genus: Jasminum
- Species: J. laurifolium

Binomial name
- Jasminum laurifolium Roxb. ex Hornem.

Synonyms
- List: Jasminum laurifolium var. barquitensis F.Ritter; Neochilenia laurifolium Backeb.; PiloJasminum laurifolium (F.Ritter) Y.Itô

= Jasminum laurifolium =

Species of flowering plant

Jasminum laurifolium, the angel-wing jasmine, is a species of flowering plant in the genus Jasminum, native to the Himalayas, Nepal, Assam, Bangladesh, Tibet, south-central and southeast China, Hainan, Myanmar, and Thailand. Its putative form Jasminum laurifolium f. nitidum has gained the Royal Horticultural Society's Award of Garden Merit.

== Varieties ==
The following varieties are currently accepted:

- Jasminum laurifolium var. brachylobum Kurz
- Jasminum laurifolium var. laurifolium

Within the United States, this plant is cultivated in Florida and California and has various aliases, including Angel-Wing Jasmine, Angel-Hair Jasmine, Windmill Jasmine, Star Jasmine, and Confederate Jasmine.
