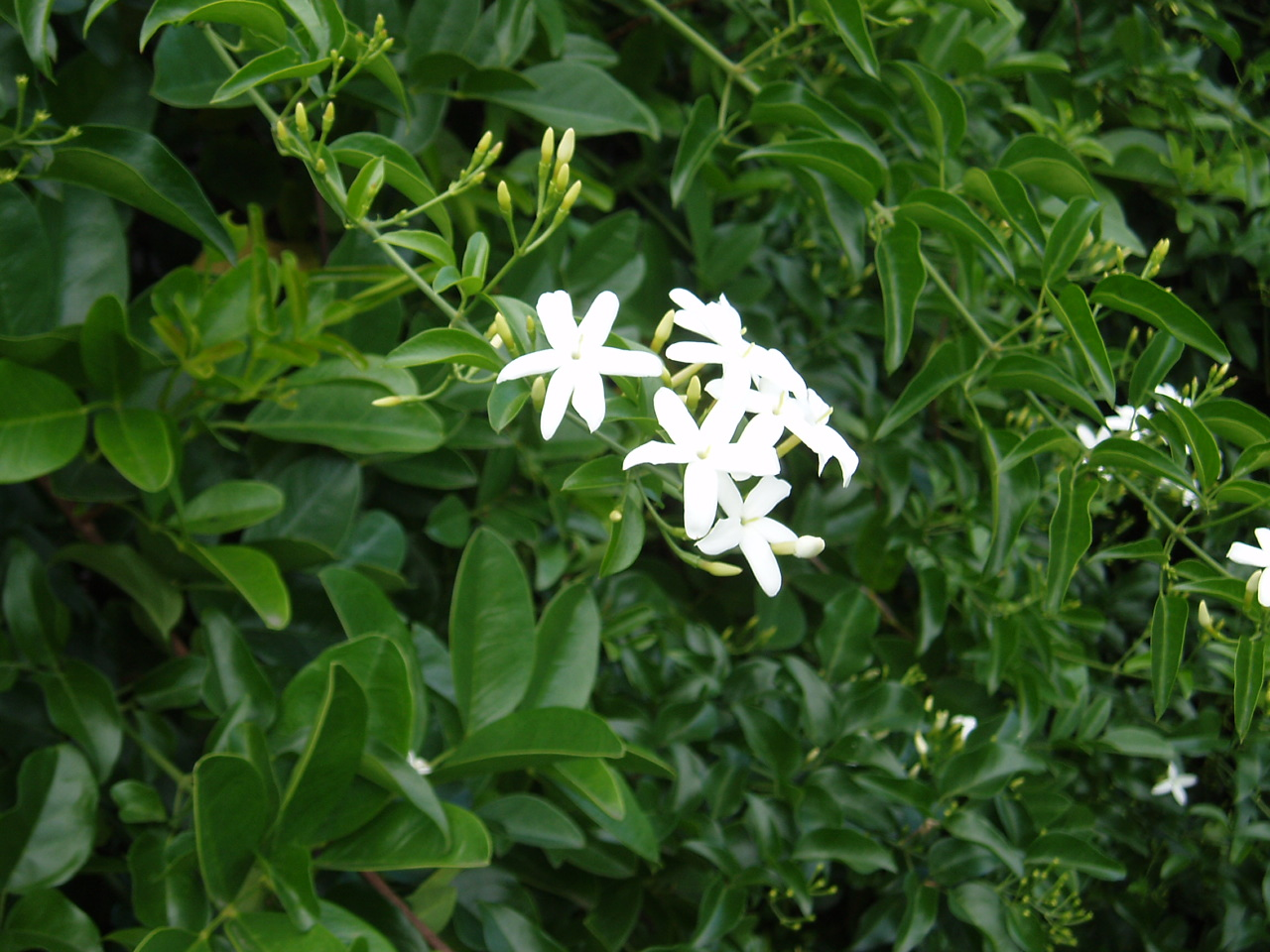

Scientific classification
- Kingdom: Plantae
- Clade: Tracheophytes
- Clade: Angiosperms
- Clade: Eudicots
- Clade: Asterids
- Order: Lamiales
- Family: Oleaceae
- Genus: Jasminum
- Species: J. fluminense

Binomial name
- Jasminum fluminense Vell.

Synonyms
- Jasminum bahiense var. fluminense; Jasminum azoricum var. fluminense

= Jasminum fluminense =

Species of plant

Jasminum fluminense is a species of vine plant.

It mainly grows in the seasonally dry tropical biomes. It is a native species to various countries in Africa and Arabia; and an invasive species in parts of the Americas.

== Common names ==
The following is a list of common names the species goes by.

- Wild jasminum

== Subspecies ==
The following is a list of subspecies for J. fluminense:

- Jasminum fluminense subsp. fluminense
- Jasminum fluminense subsp. gratissimum
- Jasminum fluminense subsp. socotranum
