= Jasminum andamanicum =

Scientific classification
- Kingdom: Plantae
- Clade: Tracheophytes
- Clade: Angiosperms
- Clade: Eudicots
- Clade: Asterids
- Order: Lamiales
- Family: Oleaceae
- Genus: Jasminum
- Species: J. andamanicum

Binomial name
- Jasminum andamanicum N.P.Balakr. & N.G.Nair

Species of jasmine

Jasminum andamanicum is an endangered endemic wild ornamental species described in 1981 from the Andaman Islands in the Bay of Bengal from two old collections by Dr King's Collector in 1894 and another one by C. E. Parkinson in 1914 deposited at CAL and PBL. This species has not been recorded from the islands until 1991 by Mathew and Abraham from Shoal Bay. This species is an evergreen component of the lowland evergreen forests of Andaman Islands. It found to grow alonge the forest edges with ample sunlight.
