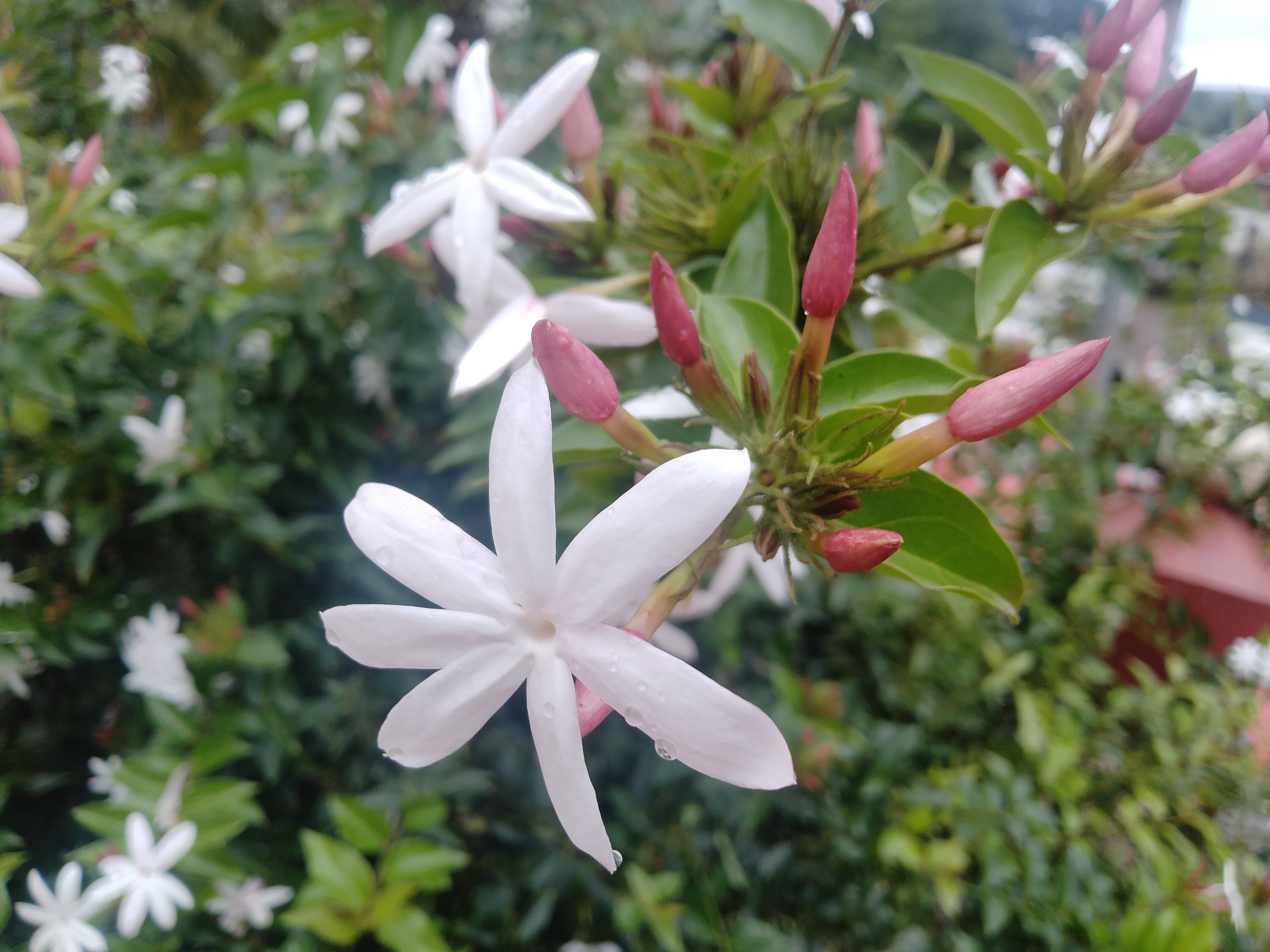

Scientific classification
- Kingdom: Plantae
- Clade: Tracheophytes
- Clade: Angiosperms
- Clade: Eudicots
- Clade: Asterids
- Order: Lamiales
- Family: Oleaceae
- Genus: Jasminum
- Species: J. dichotomum

Binomial name
- Jasminum dichotomum Vahl

Synonyms
- Jasminum brevipes Baker; Jasminum bukobense Gilg in H.G.A.Engler; Jasminum dichotomum var. brevitubum De Wild.; Jasminum gardeniodorum Gilg in D.Oliver; Jasminum gossweileri Gilg & G.Schellenb.; Jasminum guineense G.Don; Jasminum mathildae Chiov.; Jasminum noctiflorum Afzel.; Jasminum ternifolium Baker; Jasminum ternum Knobl.; Mogorium dichotomum (Vahl) Poir. in J.B.A.M.de Lamarck

= Jasminum dichotomum =

Species of jasmine

Jasminium dichotomum, the Gold Coast jasmine, is a species of jasmine, in the family Oleaceae. It is an evergreen climber which grows as a rambling shrub or woody vine. The flowers are quite fragrant and open at night, coloured pink when budding then white; these appear at the leaf axils in cluster. It blooms year round. The leaves are opposite. The fleshy fruit is small.

Jasminium dichotomum is native to tropical western and central Africa from Senegal east to Kenya and Ethiopia, south to Mozambique and Zambia, but it has been introduced to other regions and is reportedly naturalized in Florida and India. In Florida, this plant is an invasive weed; introduced as an ornamental plant in the 1920. Spreading from gardens in the 1970s, in areas with soil disturbance, the species began occupying hammocks and forests.

Its vining habit can be trimmed in a dense shrub. Glossy leaves are very ornamental in contrast with dark pink buds and snow white flowers.

== Etymology ==
'Jasminum' is a Latinized form of the Persian word, 'yasemin' for sweetly scented plants.

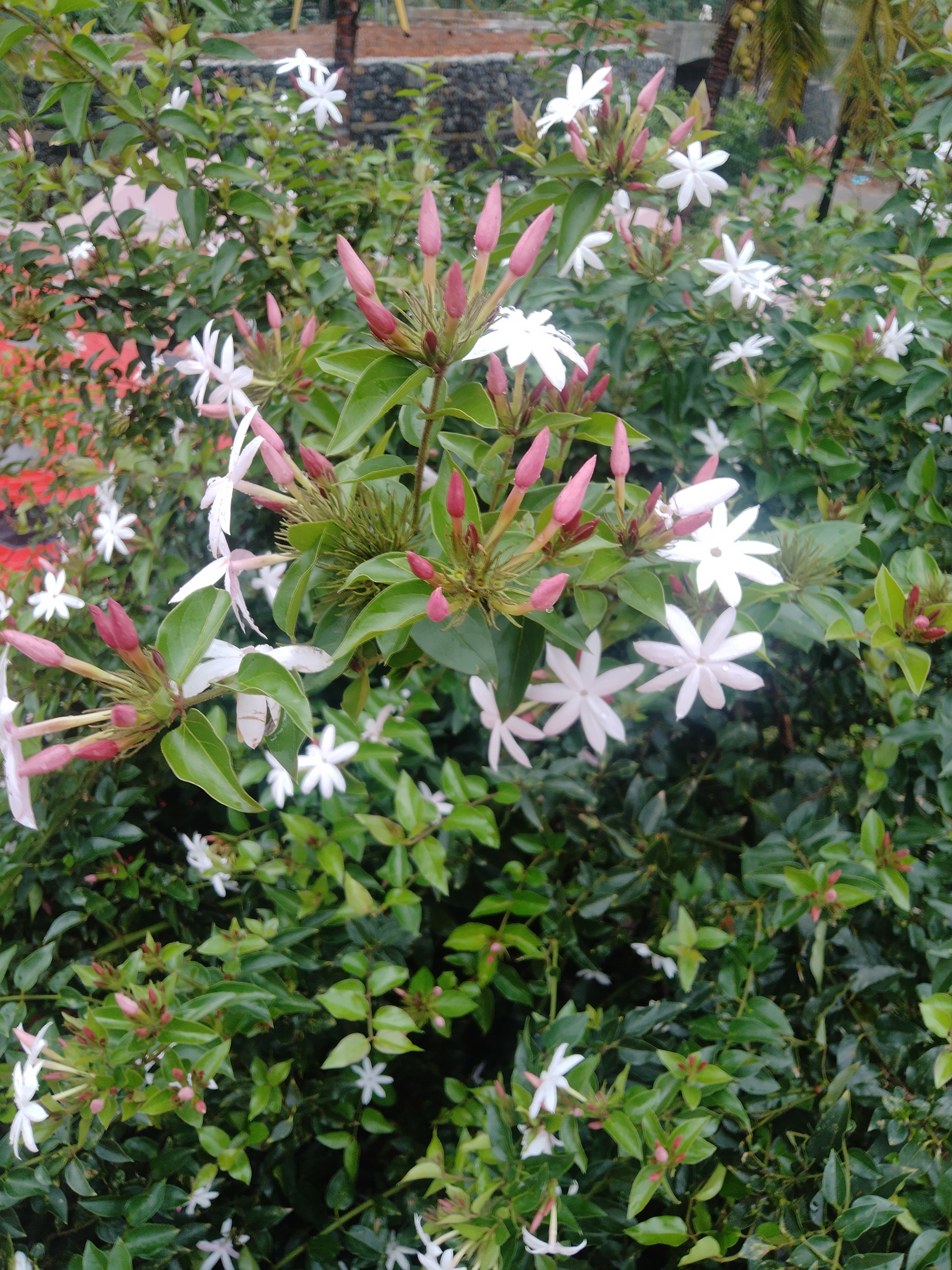
Jasminium dichotomum plant

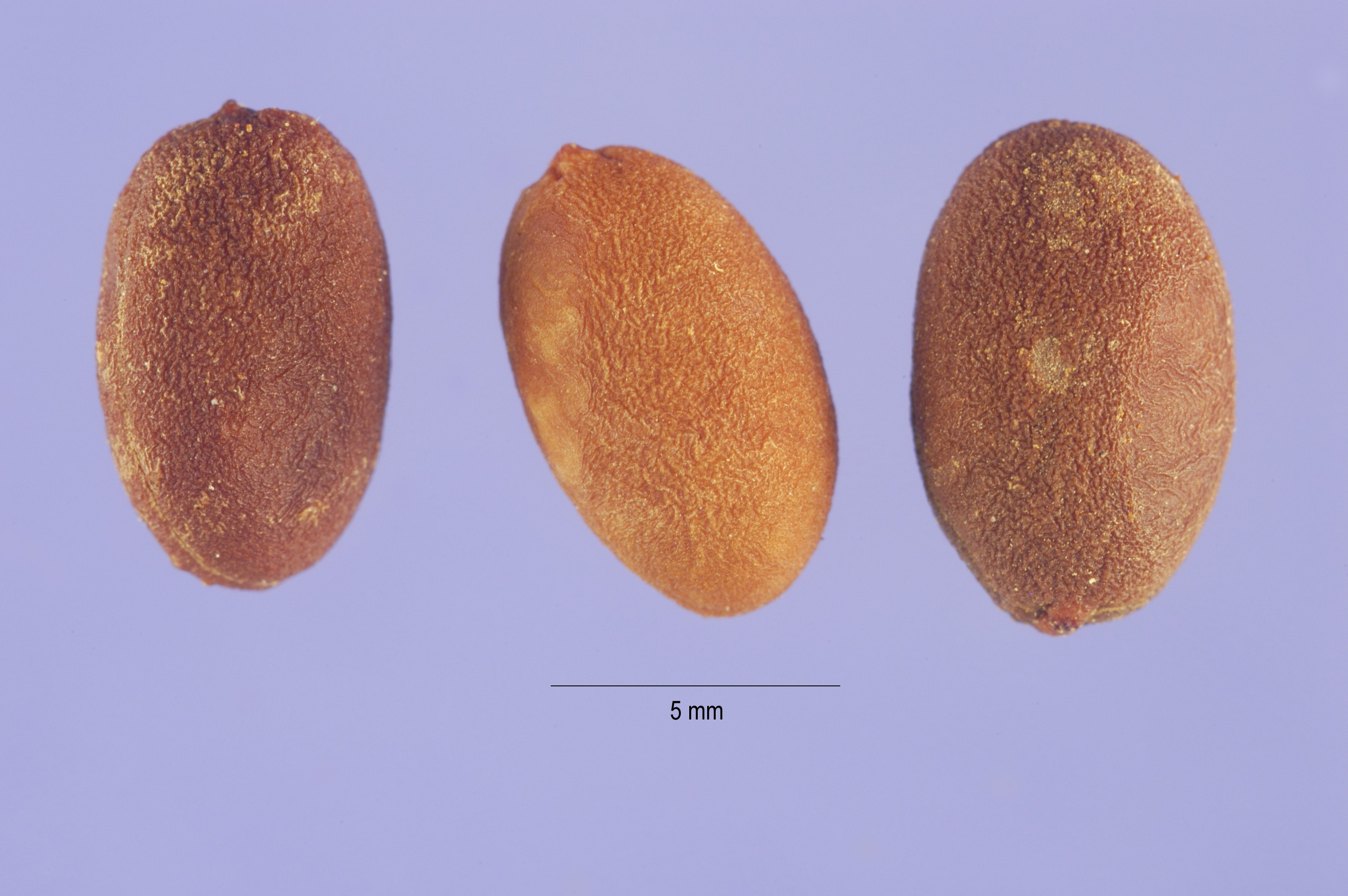
Fruit of Jasminum dichotomum

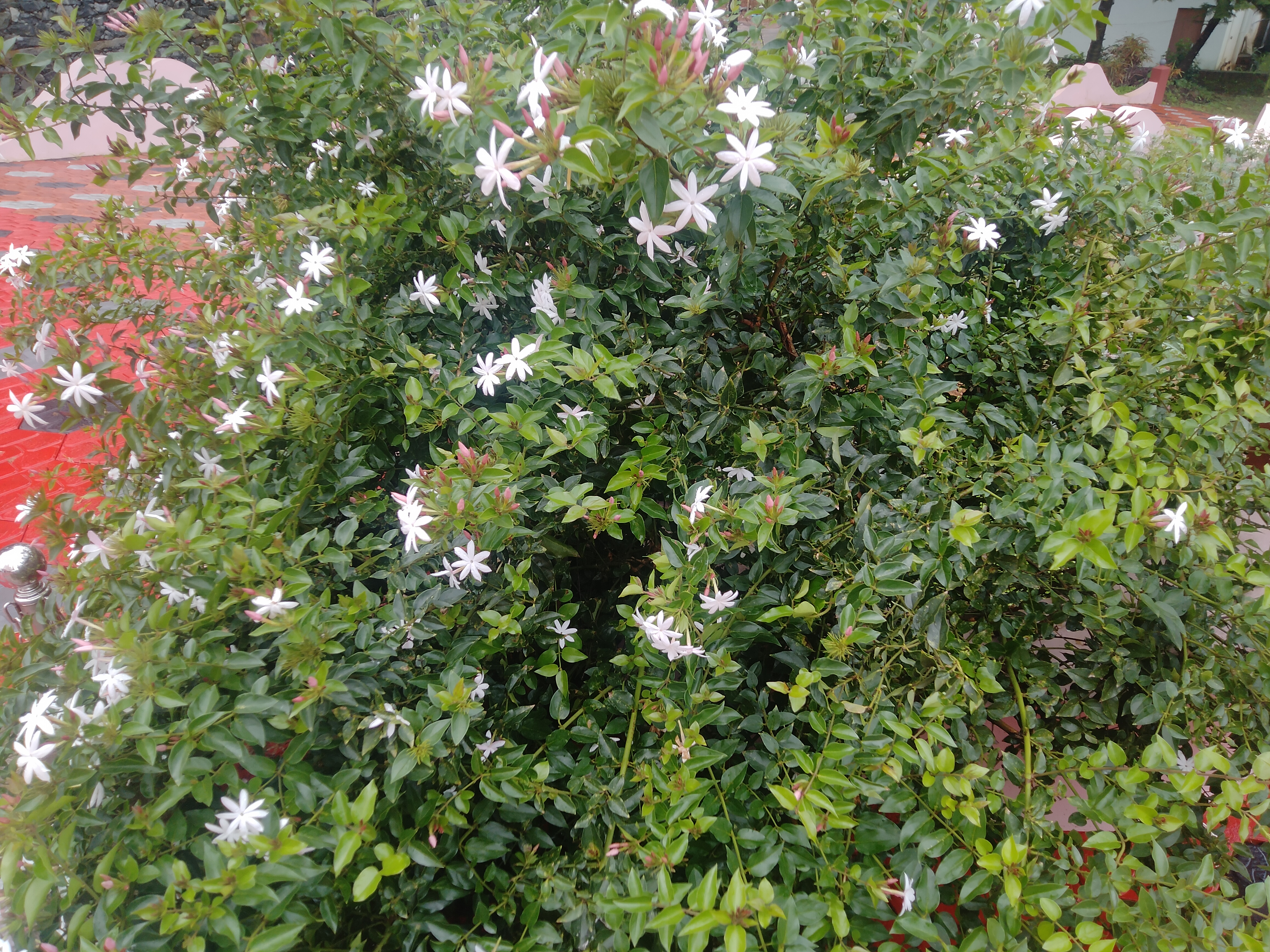
Plant with flowers and buds
