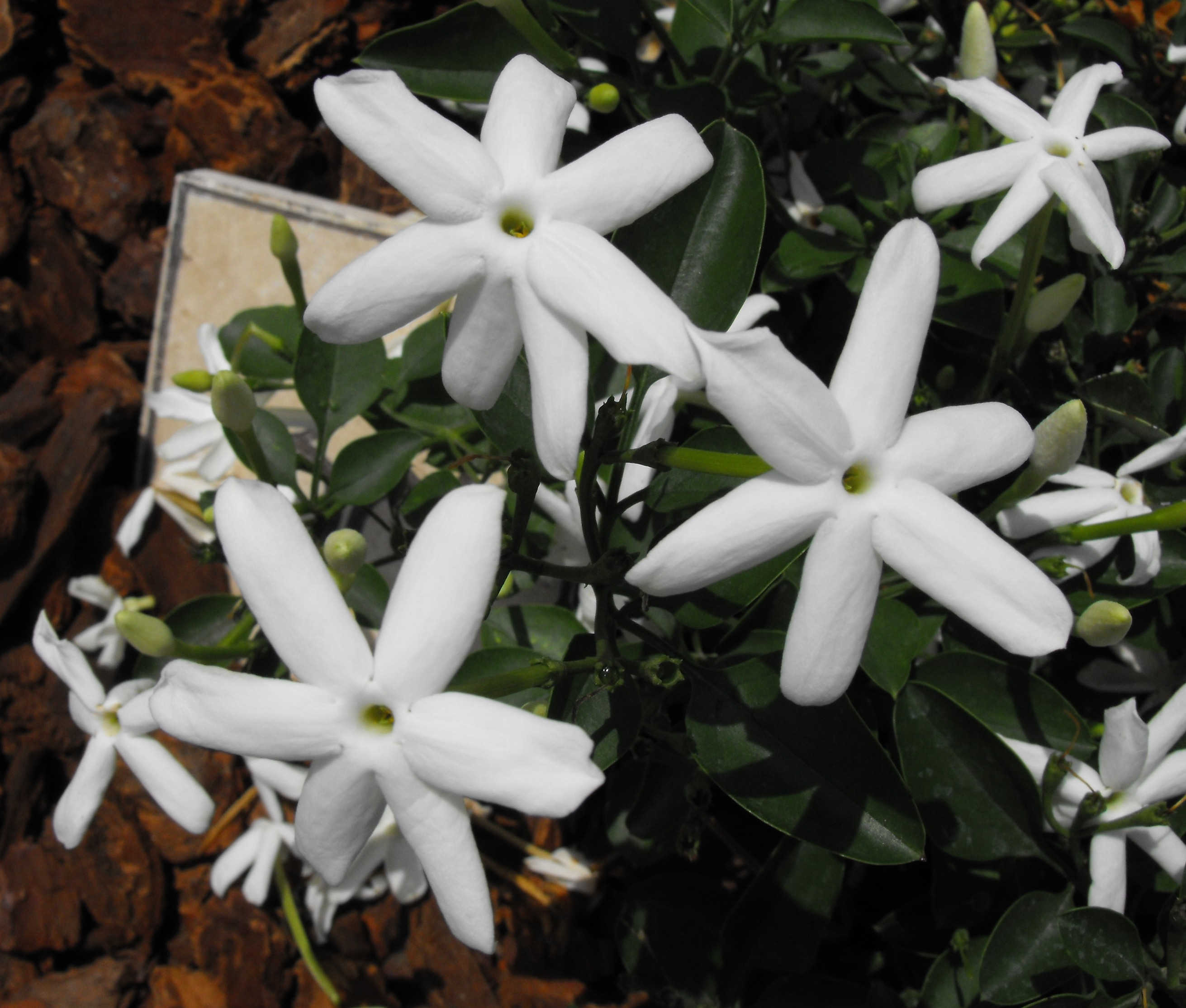

Scientific classification
- Kingdom: Plantae
- Clade: Tracheophytes
- Clade: Angiosperms
- Clade: Eudicots
- Clade: Asterids
- Order: Lamiales
- Family: Oleaceae
- Genus: Jasminum
- Species: J. angulare

Binomial name
- Jasminum angulare Vahl.

= Jasminum angulare =

Species of vine

Jasminum angulare, the wild jasmine or angular jasmine, is a species of flowering plant in the family Oleaceae that is indigenous to South Africa.

This scrambling evergreen shrub can be grown in the sun or semi-shade. It has pinnate leaves and masses of white, strongly-scented, star-shaped flowers which attract a variety of birds. This is one of around 10 species of jasmine that naturally occur in South Africa.

It does not tolerate being frozen, so in temperate regions it is best grown under glass, in an unheated greenhouse or conservatory. In the UK it has gained the Royal Horticultural Society's Award of Garden Merit.
