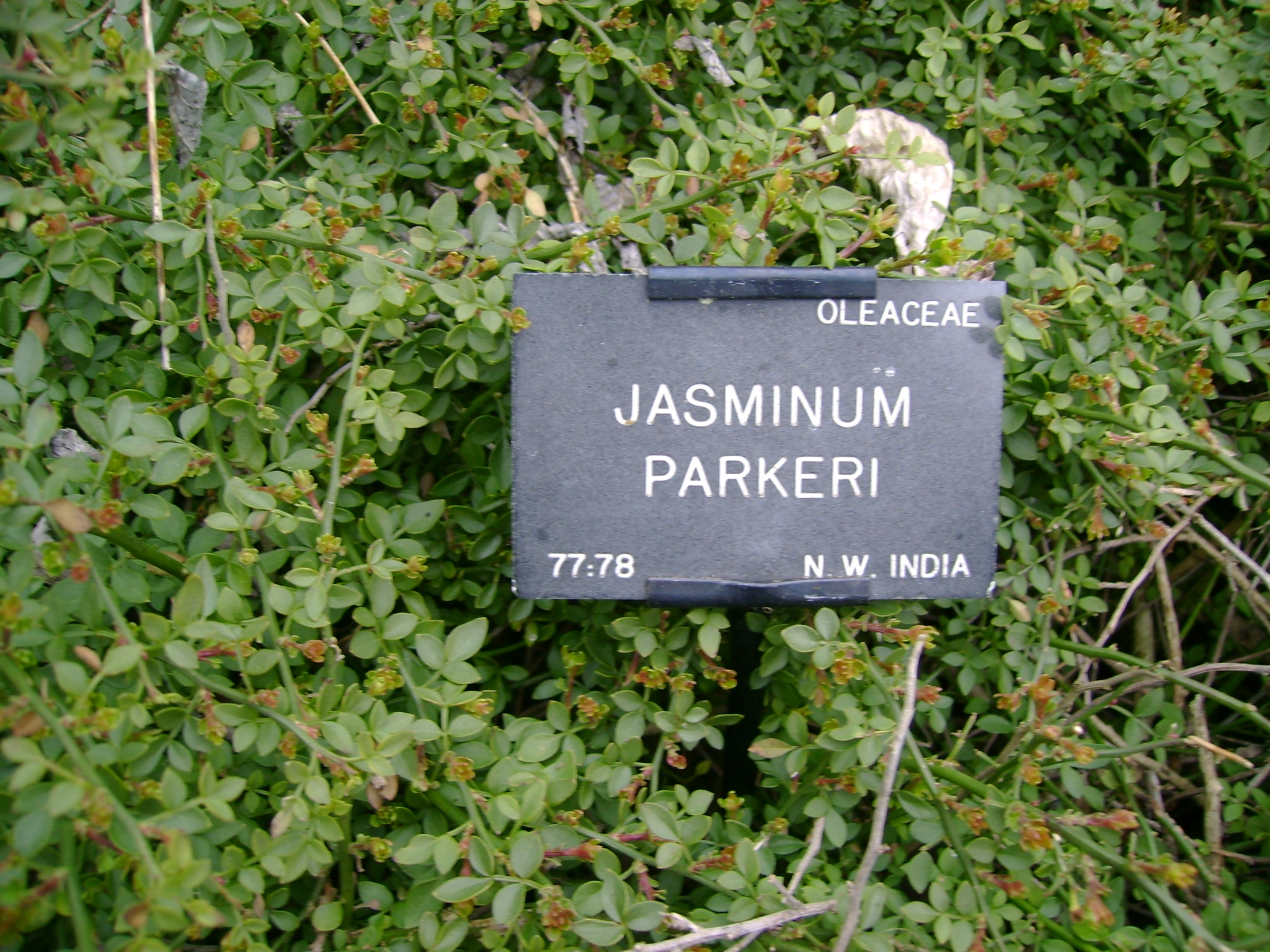

Scientific classification
- Kingdom: Plantae
- Clade: Tracheophytes
- Clade: Angiosperms
- Clade: Eudicots
- Clade: Asterids
- Order: Lamiales
- Family: Oleaceae
- Genus: Jasminum
- Species: J. parkeri

Binomial name
- Jasminum parkeri Dunn

= Jasminum parkeri =

Species of shrub

Jasminum parkeri, the dwarf jasmine, is a species of plant in the family Oleaceae. It is a domed evergreen shrub, growing to about one foot in height, which bears a muddled bunch of small stems with tiny oval leaves. Teeming clusters of fragrant, tiny 5-lobed, yellow tubular flowers, from the axils of the leaves in early summer. Dwarf jasmine is a container plant or trained around topiary form.

The plant was originally collected from Chamba District of Himachal Pradesh, India by Richard Neville Parker in 1920 as an ornamental plant and was sent to Kew botanical garden. It is highly endemic.

== Etymology ==
Jasminum is a Latinized form of the Arabic word, 'yasemin' for sweetly scented plants.
