= Jasmine Revolution =

Jasmine Revolution may refer to:

- The Tunisian revolution in which President Zine El Abidine Ben Ali was forced out of the presidency by popular protests was called the "Jasmine Revolution" by many media organisations
- The Arab Spring, which began with the Tunisian revolution, was also called the "Jasmine Revolution" by some
- The 2011 Chinese pro-democracy protests in China that were inspired by the Tunisian revolution and was called the "Jasmine Revolution" by some of the organisers
