= Tree jasmine =

Tree jasmine is a common name for several plants and may refer to:

- Millingtonia
- Radermachera ignea
