= El Arish, Stanthorpe =

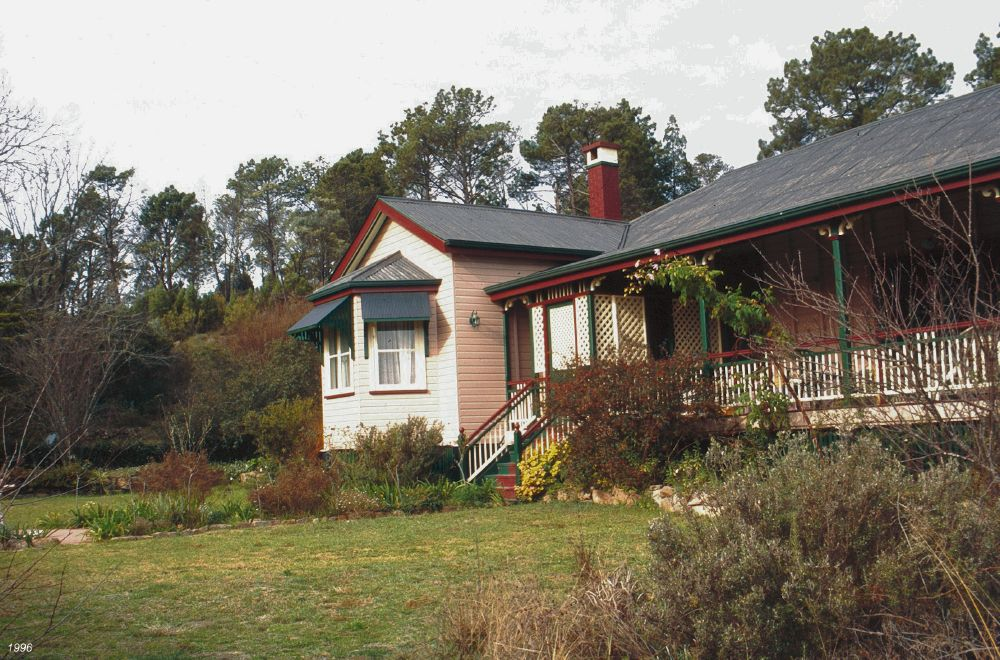
- El Arish, 1996

- Location within Queensland Location within Australia
- 28.6558°S 151.9396°E
- Location: 94 Greenup Street, Stanthorpe, Southern Downs Region, Queensland, Australia

History
- Design period: 1919–1930s (interwar period)
- Built: 1880s & early 1920s–1930s

Queensland Heritage Register
- Official name: El Arish
- Type: state heritage (landscape, archaeological, built)
- Designated: 4 October 1996
- Reference no.: 601633
- Significant period: 1880s, 1920s–1930s (fabric, historical); 1950s–1970s (social)
- Significant components: garden – rock / rockery, garden – ornamental/flower, wall/s – garden, residential accommodation – main house, wall/s – retaining, pathway/walkway, lookout /observation deck, lawn/s, garden – vegetable, views from, trees/plantings, garden – bed/s, gate – entrance, trellis, terracing, garden/grounds

El Arish is a heritage-listed house and gardens at 94 Greenup Street, Stanthorpe, Southern Downs Region, Queensland, Australia. It was built from 1880s & early 1920s to 1930s. It was added to the Queensland Heritage Register on 4 October 1996.

== History ==
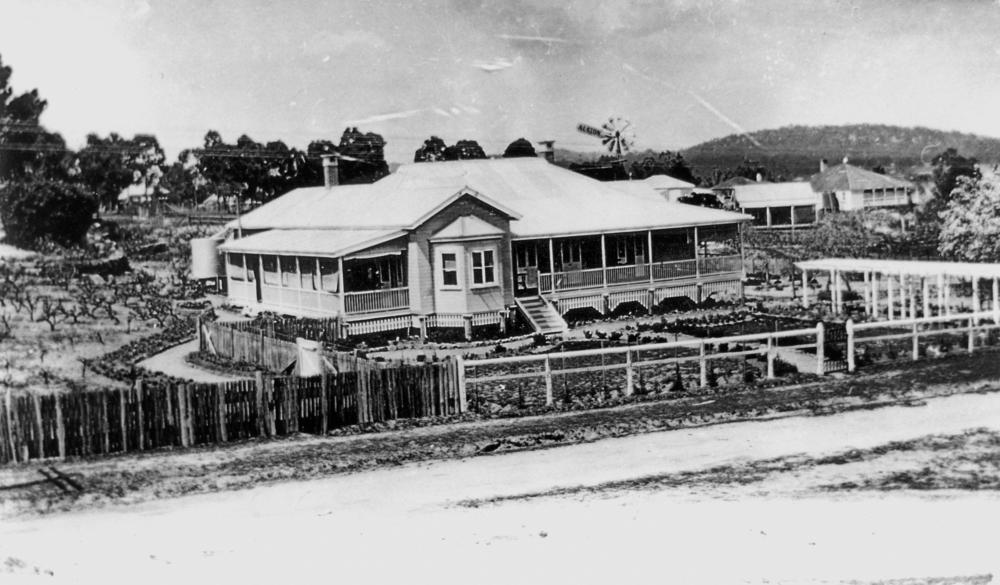
House known as El Arish at Stanthorpe, ca. 1920

The garden and house which comprise El Arish were established in the early 1920s by Major Allan and Isabella Chauvel on the site of a former market garden in Stanthorpe.

The major impetus to development in Stanthorpe occurred in 1872 with the start of the practice of alluvial tin mining after discoveries of the valuable metal in the area earlier in the mid 1850s. Stanthorpe become the collective name for two townships which grew as a result of the mining boom and became the only centre on the pastoral Darling Downs to develop with a mining based revenue.

Stanthorpe was situated on part of the early Folkestone Run, which was occupied from November 1846 by Matthew Henry Marsh, who acquired 160 acres (65 ha) of the run on pre-emptive purchase in October 1852. Alford Greenup assumed the management of the run in 1868, and by 1878 as a result of the tin mining boom Marsh converted his run into the private township of Stannum, which is a Latin word meaning tin. The Government surveyed land on each side of Stannum and formed a township known as Stanthorpe, and the towns were incorporated. Public sales were held soon after the subdivision of the town into building allotments.

Portions 166 and 167 of what was the Folkestone Run, later the site of El Arish, were sold to Karl Wilhelm Scholz in 1878. Scholz had arrived on the Darling Downs from Germany in 1872. As the tin mines of Stanthorpe became depleted the town became more reliant on market gardening as a source of revenue and Scholz established a market garden on his selection soon after its purchase. He cleared all natural vegetation from the site by 1890, and planted vegetable crops for short-term income whilst the orchards and vineyards matured. At this time wide paling fences were built as boundaries and the rear of the site was terraced. The garden was very successful though part of it was established on seemingly inhospitable land with massive granite outcrops on the side of a hill. Scholz's produce was often awarded prizes at local agricultural exhibitions.

In 1915 Scholz sold his property to Walter Hall and Ephriam Albert Maddock, who sold it soon after in June 1919 to Charles Frederick White, a member of a prominent Armidale family. White owned the property for only 12 months before he sold it to Susan Isabella Chauvel (née Barnes), who was commonly known as Isabella. She borrowed £1150 from White for the purchase of the property. Isabella was married to Allan Chauvel and they owned and managed a pastoral property, Summerlands, in the Fassifern Valley. The purchase of the property in Stanthorpe was to provide the Chauvel family with a summer residence.

=== Chauvel period ===
It was during the Chauvel's ownership that the property in Stanthorpe was named El Arish recalling Allan Chauvel's involvement in the First World War. Allan and his brother, Henry George Chauvel, later knighted, were born in Tabulam, New South Wales and grew up on a cattle station on the Clarence River. Family tradition dictated Henry and Allan's military involvement, firstly with the local Upper Clarence Light Horse established by their father, Charles Henry Edward Chauvel. When Allan and Henry moved with their family to a station in southern Queensland, Canning Downs South on the Darling Downs, the men continued their involvement with local volunteer light horse brigades. By the First World War Henry Chauvel who had also served in the Boer War, was chosen to command the 1st Light Horse Brigade. Allan Chauvel served in World War One, alongside his brother, as a major.

Henry, as one of the commanding officers, and Allan were involved in the 1916–17 Desert Column appeal which saw the advancement of the British troops across the desert into Palestine, driving the Turkish army from Aleppo on the northern borders of Syria. The Light Horse Brigade was the spearhead of the advancing forces. Under Henry Chauvel's command the forces destroyed Turkish garrisons at Rafa in December 1916 and then, Maghaba in January 1917. This opened access for an assault on the principal Turkish positions near Gaza and Beersheba. After the attack on Maghaba the Light Horse Brigade found themselves without water and returned to a small village, El Arish where they re-stocked and celebrated their victory. El Arish is an Arabic word meaning "place of rest" and it is therefore appropriate that this name should be given to the Chauvel family's summer residence.

Allan and Isabella Chauvel had five children, of these the eldest son John become an Anglican church minister and Charles the second son was a renowned Australian filmmaker. Charles Chauvel and his wife, Elsa, were among the instigators of the Australian film industry in the 1920s and 1930s. Charles was born in 1897 in Warwick and was educated at Ipswich Grammar School and, from family reminiscences, it appears that his father, Allan, planned that Charles would remain on the land, continuing the Chauvel pastoral tradition. However Charles studied commercial art and took drama classes, and from 1920 worked for many early film-makers in both Australia and Hollywood. Late in 1923 he returned to Australia to begin his career making his own films. He returned to Hollywood many times over the next few years, seeking funding from large studios for his own locally made projects. Charles and Elsa Chauvel were given land in Stanthorpe by Isabella Chauvel on which they built a house, so that they could be nearer to his mother and continue assistance with Isabella's project which was the garden at El Arish.

According to family history, Allan and Isabella Chauvel had a cottage moved to its present location at El Arish soon after they acquired the property. Stanthorpe at this time was experiencing a transitional period when it became well known as a "sanatorium" and the destination of many summer holiday makers seeking retreat from city life. A general concern with one's health, after the influenza epidemic and the war, was manifest in the advertising of developing holiday destinations who claimed that fresh air, either by the sea or in the mountains was beneficial to one's well-being. Sea side resorts, like Southport, Burleigh Heads, and Redcliffe became very popular along with mountain resorts like Stanthorpe.

Supporting this new focus of the Stanthorpe economy, the Southern railway line which had been introduced in 1881 had been extended through to Wallangarra on the New South Wales/Queensland border in 1887, though was only finished in 1920 making Stanthorpe more accessible to a large population base. The town's location on the Granite Belt, produced an unusual landscape of granite outcrops amid lush vegetation which was attractive to prospective holiday makers. Stanthorpe, like the other towns developing at this time in the southeastern region of Queensland became serviced with an infrastructure vital for its role as holiday destination. Such services included private boarding houses and hotels, as well as facilities for a wide range of leisure activities such as golf, tennis, bowling, swimming, bush walking, horse racing and picnicking.

The Chauvels used El Arish as a summer residence where they could take advantage of, not only a more temperate climate, but increased social activity which was developing in Stanthorpe at the time. They would come from their pastoral property, Summerlands, in the Fassifern Valley, where Allan was involved in local politics. Upon their arrival in Stanthorpe work began on the creation of the marvellous garden upon the remnants of the market garden which, since the Scholzes departure had not been commercially used.

== Gardens ==
The garden which the Chauvels created was carefully planned to include some remnants of Scholz's garden including an early Williams pear tree and several Isabella grape vines. It is reputed that these vines were brought by Scholz to Australia from the south of France when he emigrated and were arranged in the garden on trellised arbours. The Chauvels' garden in Stanthorpe took great advantage of many of the site's intrinsic qualities; making a feature of the aspect and incline of the land and the natural granite outcrops.

According to family history, the garden at El Arish was designed by Isabella and her son, Charles. They worked to create a garden which allowed a variety of experiences and views as one walked through the varying garden sections. A sense of enclosure is achieved in several of the smaller sections of the gardens, most importantly in the formal garden where the house, hedge and screening devices create smaller areas. This sense of enclosure is created also in other areas; in the bamboo grove and within screened and hedged sections of the formal garden. The paths built upon the terraces established by Scholz allow one to stroll through a created "natural" (but not native) environment. These paths terminate at a natural lookout on the highest point in the garden, from which one can orient oneself not only within the confines of the El Arish property but within Stanthorpe. The manner in which the garden affords these changing experiences, allowing both action and contemplation from one section to another is a characteristic feature of many famous gardens of the time.

In fact, El Arish has many characteristics of English Arts and Crafts gardens of the late nineteenth and early twentieth centuries which did inspire and influence many Australian garden designers. Notable British gardens of this type were the work of many acclaimed designers most significantly William Robinson and Gertrude Jekyll, who wrote widely in journals about their design philosophy as did others like British novelist Vita Sackville-West, a serious and dedicated garden enthusiast. These writings are thought to have influenced garden design in Australia, most evident in the work of acclaimed landscape architect, Edna Walling.

Many gardening ideas of the time are apparent at El Arish; contrived "wild" sections of plantings; emphasis on contrasting foliage, particularly involving sub-tropical plants and the use of rock- gardening, along with planning and layout ideas including the use of local quarried stone walling, a sense of enclosure, a myriad of paths and terraces and a consciousness of the local environment. The Chauvel family had many close family ties in Britain and during the involvement of the brothers Henry and Allan in the wars, their families spent time in England. Charles Chauvel was involved with the design of many of the gates and walls at El Arish, bringing hinges and gate fittings from a Spanish Mission in California from one of his trips to America. He is also thought to have constructed many of the dry-stone walls in the garden.

The El Arish garden was divided into several distinct compartments, a feature of many renowned gardens both in Britain and Australia of the time. These included a formal compartment to the west of the house; a large informal or stroll garden to the north and east of the house; a service compartment to the immediate south of the home and around the caretakers' house on the south boundary of the property and an open park and woodland to the south of the house incorporating a wood and orchard; with another informal compartment containing the horse paddock to the south of this.

The formal compartment was created between the house and a hedge along the Greenup Street boundary of the property providing a conventionally formal entrance and view to the house; a place where guests could be greeted and entertained. This area was screened on the north by a rose arbour and gateway, and on the south by a bamboo grove. The plantings in this area were carefully planned in symmetrically composed beds with the manicured cypress hedge contributing to the general geometric nature of this section. A decomposed gravel path flanked by planted borders extended from the front gate on Greenup Street, in the hedge, to the front door of the house.

The informal compartments of the garden, including the stroll garden and the garden on the southern boundary of the property, were places for family and friends' relaxation and recreation. The stroll garden incorporates that area developed on the northern side of the property by Scholz, where he produced several terraced areas conforming with the contours of the site. The Chauvels planned pathways through this area with several visual focal points, like specimen planting and small garden structures constructed from natural timbers and covered with wisteria and grape vines.

The open park and woodland to the south of the house at El Arish was identified in a recent study of the garden as an areas which "provided the visual setting for the buildings and garden areas while buffering the site from encroachment". In this area found to the south of the house was an orchard containing fruit and nut trees, a large lawn and a pine grove which obscured the tennis court and boundary fences from the house and the rest of the garden. The service compartments of the garden included the kitchen garden adjacent to the south of the house and the area around the caretakers' cottage on the southern boundary.

The garden at El Arish has survived in a form retaining many of the characteristics of the early garden; the zoning system is still evident with surviving plantings and layout. Though the garden has diminished in size with the sub-division of the land, the formal garden remains largely intact as do large sections of the informal stroll garden and smaller sections of that section used as a service garden. Most of open park and woodland to the south of the house and the tennis court beyond this have been sub-divided from the garden.

=== Species ===
The garden is almost entirely composed of exotic species. Three major specimen trees are found along the Greenup Street boundary, include a Lebanon cedar (Cedrus libani), several walnut trees (Juglans regia) and a grafted Williams pear tree (Pyrus communis). Several hedges were planted, the most noticeable along Greenup Street; cypress (× Cupressocyparis leylandii), and several smaller sections scattered throughout the garden; woodland hawthorn (Crataegus laevigata), yellow jasmine (Jasminum fruticans) and pink may bush (Spiraea × bumalda). Some of the other, more notable plantings from the Chauvel era include the century plants (Agave americana), black bamboo grove (Bambusa nigra); the grafted English hawthorn (Crataegus monogyna); red pyracantha (Pyracantha rogersiana) and orange pyracantha (Pyracantha angustifolia); English lavender (Lavandula augustifolia); many roses including the Dorothy Perkins rose, Gallipoli or rock rose, red letter rose and Polsen Bedda rose; Banksia rose; black boy rose; mermaid rose; as well as a proliferation of wisteria (Wisteria floribunda), Isabella grape vines (Vitis vinifera); honeysuckles, a large number of flowering annuals including hollyhock, wallflower, cosmos, dahlia, delphinium, foxglove, baby's breath, jonquil, alyssum, stock, forget-me-not and zinnia. The many other notable trees include Japanese maple (Acer palmatum); flowering dogwood (Cornus florida); flowering plum (Prunus × blirelana); English elm (Ulmus procera); English oak (Quercus robur), Deodar cedar (Cedrus deodara) and crepe myrtle (Lagerstroemia indica).

== House ==
The house was an integral part of the landscape produced at El Arish, providing a focus for the formal part of the garden and a buffer between the other sections. The house in which the Chauvel's lived was moved to its present site, though accounts vary as to the origin of the building with family reminiscences recalling the building used as both the earlier Scholz residence which was altered and extended, and also a cottage purchased from Killarney and moved to Stanthorpe. There are similarities between the extant house at El Arish and an early photograph of the Scholz residence, both are single skinned buildings with external framing and bracing, though many other details have been altered.

The house was intended as a summer residence, hence its light weight timber construction and verandahs, which may seem an inappropriate choice for a Stanthorpe residence where winter temperatures dictate a more insulated dwelling. Early photographs of the house from the Chauvel family, show a simple asymmetrical timber dwelling with low pitched hipped roof extending over a verandah on the principal entrance facade. The house has simple details; a traditional verandah balustrade with dowel balusters and square planned columns. Photographs of the house often feature a verandah screening device, either striped fabric awnings or timber blinds.

By the early 1930s it seems that Isabella was living at El Arish permanently, preferring the climate of Stanthorpe and the social opportunities the town presented, to that in the Fassifern Valley, where Allan still maintained the family property. Prior to the deaths of Allan and Isabella within nine months of one another in 1939, El Arish was their permanent home. On the death of Isabella, in whose name the title to the property was held, on 20 November 1939 El Arish was passed to her son, Charles Chauvel but by September 1940 the property was transferred to his sister, Jean Chauvel.

The task of maintaining the large garden and house at El Arish was an onerous one and Jean Chauvel subdivided the property a number of times, to reduce the scope of maintenance and to offset the financial burdens caused by death duties. Several houses now sit on what were sections of the service and informal garden to the south and southwest of the house. Jean also undertook many renovations to the house, demolishing the rear wing and making the home more habitable for the winter months.

During World War II El Arish was used to house a number of families and Jean was billeted to share another house in the town before leaving to serve in the war herself. Jean returned to El Arish and, in 1957 after appropriate training, opened the first kindergarten in the district which she operated until her retirement in 1975. The house was then renovated for use as two flats and passed through a number of hands before its purchase by the current owners, David and Carey-Lee Downs. Though the garden suffered from neglect during the years after the Chauvel's residence there, the Downs have made a significant contribution to its conservation.

== Heritage description ==
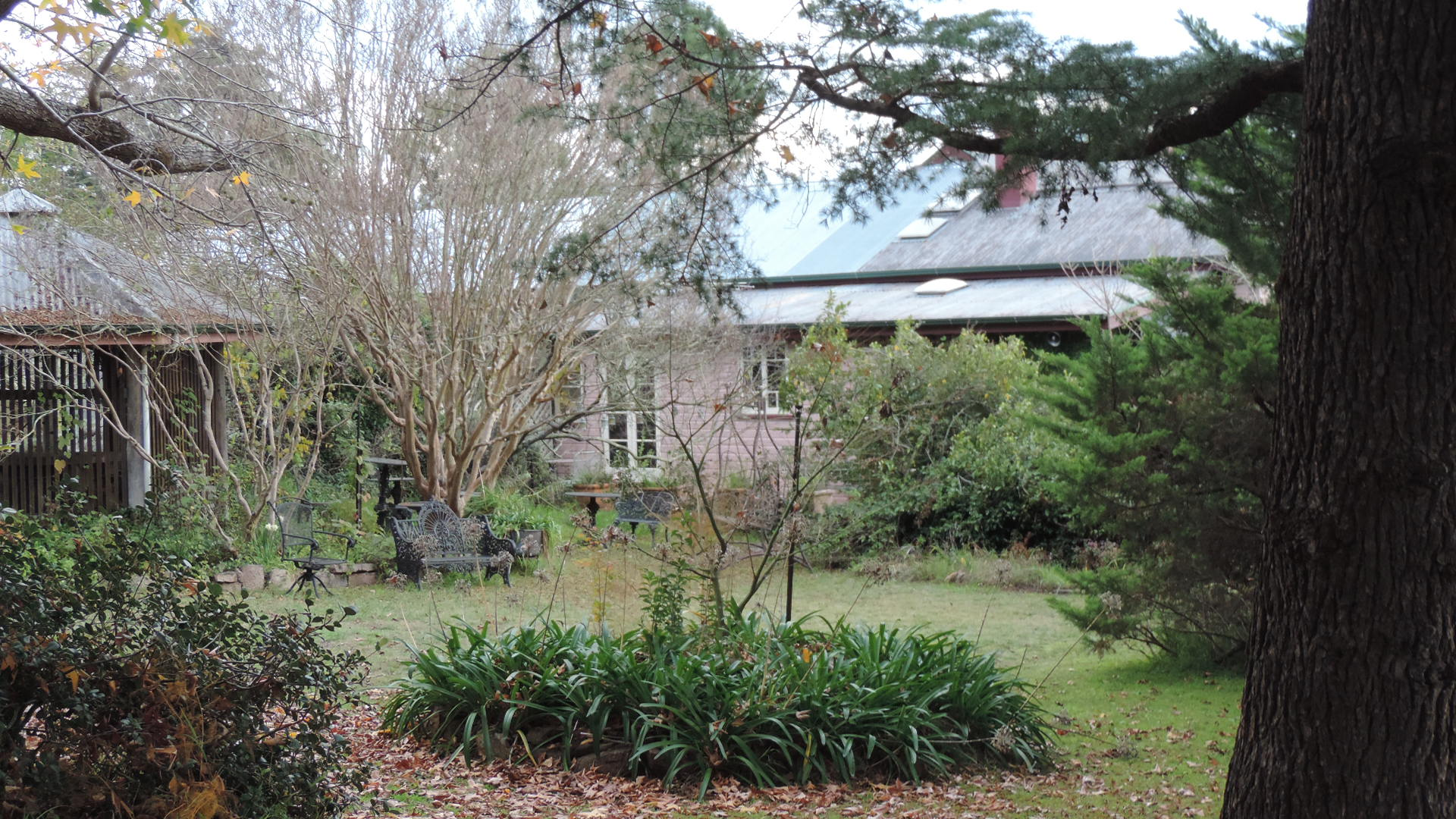
Side view of El Arish house and garden, 2015

El Arish consists of a single-storeyed chamferboard residence, with a corrugated iron roof, set amidst a structured garden comprising distinct formal, informal and service areas. El Arish is located on the western slope of Foxton's Hill, adjoining the rugged landscape of the Stanthorpe Soldiers Memorial reserve at the rear, with the highest section of the property affording views over Stanthorpe a short distance to the west.

The residence is located towards the southern section of the site facing Greenup Street to the northwest. The formal garden compartment is located to the west and northwest, the informal stroll garden is located to the north and along the eastern boundary, and the service garden is located to the south of the residence.

The formal garden compartment is screened by a very large Cypress hedge along the western boundary to Greenup Street, and contains a geometric layout of gardens, hedges and shrubs with defined boundaries and a distinct pink and white theme. This garden was originally used to formally greet guests and create an impressions of the family's status, and the front verandah formed an adjunct to this garden for entertaining. Entry to El Arish is via a narrow arched opening in the hedge, facing northwest along the axis of Lock Street opposite, with a rustic timber gate with metal fittings. The northwest section of the formal garden contains a lawn, bisected by a concrete path leading to the residence, bordered by garden beds. The northern boundary of this section of the garden has a low stone wall, screen planting and a hedge, with a central gateway providing access to the informal stroll garden beyond. The gateway has a rustic timber gate with metal fittings, an arched metal lamp post with lantern, and a section of stone flagging with stone steps.

The western section of the formal garden is bordered by the driveway along the southern boundary and contains a reconstructed timber pergola supporting an Isabella grape vine at the southern end. The garden also contains a grafted William's pear tree, which shades a stone bench seat, and the stump of a Walnut tree from the original Walnut grove, both of which are remnants of Scholz's market garden. The remains of a fish pond is located amidst remnant rose bushes, and hedges and shrubs divide the garden spatially with an accent on content and form. A large Black Bamboo, enclosing secluded pathways with stone edgings, screens the adjacent service garden compartment to the south of the residence. A non-original cricket practice net is located in the western corner.

The informal garden was designed to be more private, and intimate spaces were created for the family's enjoyment and relaxation. The garden has an overall rustic character which was intended to invite exploration in the manner of an English stroll garden. There are controlled entry points within the garden, with several route options and focal points. Mass plantings in scale with the garden spaces has been employed, rather than the emphasis being given to individual plants and diversity as in the formal garden. Tall specimen planting and obscured views of boundaries have been utilised to give the impression of increased space, with the garden seemingly extending over boundaries to the rugged landscape of the adjoining public space.

The eastern side of the informal garden rises steeply towards the adjoining Stanthorpe Soldiers Memorial reserve, and consists of natural rock surfaces and stone terracing, some of which dates from Scholz's market garden and has been built up to form a maze of planting and paths. Planting includes agaves and Century plants, and a path leads to a stone lookout on the eastern boundary which affords expansive views over El Arish and Stanthorpe to the west. The stroll garden contains narrow paths with several arched trellises, and a non- original concrete water tank has been constructed in the southeast corner.

The northern section of the informal garden is relatively level, and has a timber post and rail fence along the Greenup Street boundary. This section of the garden contains tall Oak and Cedar trees, with low stone walls and areas planted with bulbs and containing remnant rose bushes. A large wisteria and the remains of a rustic pergola are located to the northeast of the residence, and garden beds and areas of lawn with a clothes line and fruit trees are located to the east of the house. The remains of the original woodland area of the garden, which is outside of the current garden boundary, can be seen to the south on the adjoining property.

The service garden was designed as a work and service area, and includes a driveway, guest parking, rear entry, garage and small kitchen garden. The service garden also contains the foundation remains of the maintenance shed, and has obscured views towards the formal and informal gardens. The rear entry to the residence has non- original timber pergola, stone flagged path, a lamp post with a stone base and a small hedge.

The single-storeyed chamferboard residence has a hipped corrugated iron roof with projecting gables, stumps with timber batten infill, and a verandah on the northwest with timber posts, brackets, balustrade and lattice-screened entry. A gabled projecting bay on the northern side of the entry has casement windows, and the verandah wall has single-skin exposed framing and French doors. The northeast verandah has been enclosed with chamferboard, and a stone flagged terrace has been added. The southwest section of the front verandah has also been enclosed. The rear of the building has been altered, with an original rear wing having been removed and verandahs enclosed and extended. Windows are mainly casements, some with corrugated iron and timber batten sunhoods, and a corrugated iron garage has been built adjacent to the southeast corner of the residence.

Internally, the residence has been redesigned several times.

== Heritage listing ==
El Arish was listed on the Queensland Heritage Register on 4 October 1996 having satisfied the following criteria.

The place is important in demonstrating the evolution or pattern of Queensland's history.

The development of Stanthorpe is unique within the pastoral and agricultural Darling Downs region, initially owing its growth and prosperity to tin mining, and in the early twentieth century to market gardening and summer holiday making. El Arish, which was originally a market garden and then a summer residence from the early 1920s, is one of the few surviving properties which reflects the contribution of both market gardening and tourism to the development of the town.

The place demonstrates rare, uncommon or endangered aspects of Queensland's cultural heritage.

Characteristic elements of the early market garden survive at El Arish including a rare and early Williams pear tree, Isabella grape vines, sections of dry stone walling and terraced sections of the garden which were incorporated into the later Chauvel garden. These elements are illustrative of the establishment of market gardens in and around Stanthorpe from the 1880s.

El Arish is a characteristic example of a summer residence established in Stanthorpe in the 1920s during a period of significant tourist activity which saw many buildings constructed to support this new industry.

The garden at El Arish is an important and rare surviving example of a 1920s Queensland garden influenced by Arts and Crafts gardening ideals. It was designed by Isabella and her son, Charles, to allow a variety of experiences and functions within different areas. Many of the early features remain extant. The cypress hedge along Greenup Street is a marvellous feature of the garden and a rare example of a hedge of this size and extent in Queensland.

The place is important in demonstrating the principal characteristics of a particular class of cultural places.

El Arish is a characteristic and rare example of a summer residence established in Stanthorpe in the 1920s during a period of intense tourist activity which saw many buildings constructed to support this new industry. The timber residence was initially intended for use during the summer months. The name chosen for the property by the Chauvels was El Arish, meaning "place of rest", and this commemorates a town in the Sinai and recalled Allan Chauvel's involvement in the Middle East during World War I.

The place is important because of its aesthetic significance.

El Arish makes a significant aesthetic contribution to the Stanthorpe streetscape, and with its location at the base of the Stanthorpe Soldier's Memorial reserve, is a recognised local landmark. The separation of the garden into distinct areas provides a range of aesthetic experiences including formal plantings emphasising individual plants and diversity; geometric layouts of gardens, hedges and shrubs with defined boundaries; themed flowering displays; rustic stroll gardens inviting exploration; private and intimate spaces; tall specimen planting and obscured boundaries which give the impression of increased space with the garden seemingly extending over boundaries to the rugged landscape of the adjoining public space; natural rock surfaces; stone faced terracing; distant views; mass plantings in scale with garden spaces; and various garden structures.

The place is important in demonstrating a high degree of creative or technical achievement at a particular period.

The garden displays significant creative achievement in its design, choice of plantings and utilisation of the site.

The place has a strong or special association with a particular community or cultural group for social, cultural or spiritual reasons.

The first kindergarten in the Stanthorpe district was operated at El Arish from 1957 until 1975. Many residents of Stanthorpe attended the kindergarten and the property has a special association with the community for this reason.

The place has a special association with the life or work of a particular person, group or organisation of importance in Queensland's history.

El Arish is associated with several people of importance to Queensland history. The Chauvel family who developed the property as their summer residence have a long and acclaimed history in the Armed Forces in Australia. Allan Chauvel's brother, Henry, was knighted for his service in World War I, where Allan served as a Major. Allan and Isabella Chauvel's son Charles, who helped to plan the garden, was a renowned Australian film maker who, with his wife Elsa, made many early important films.
