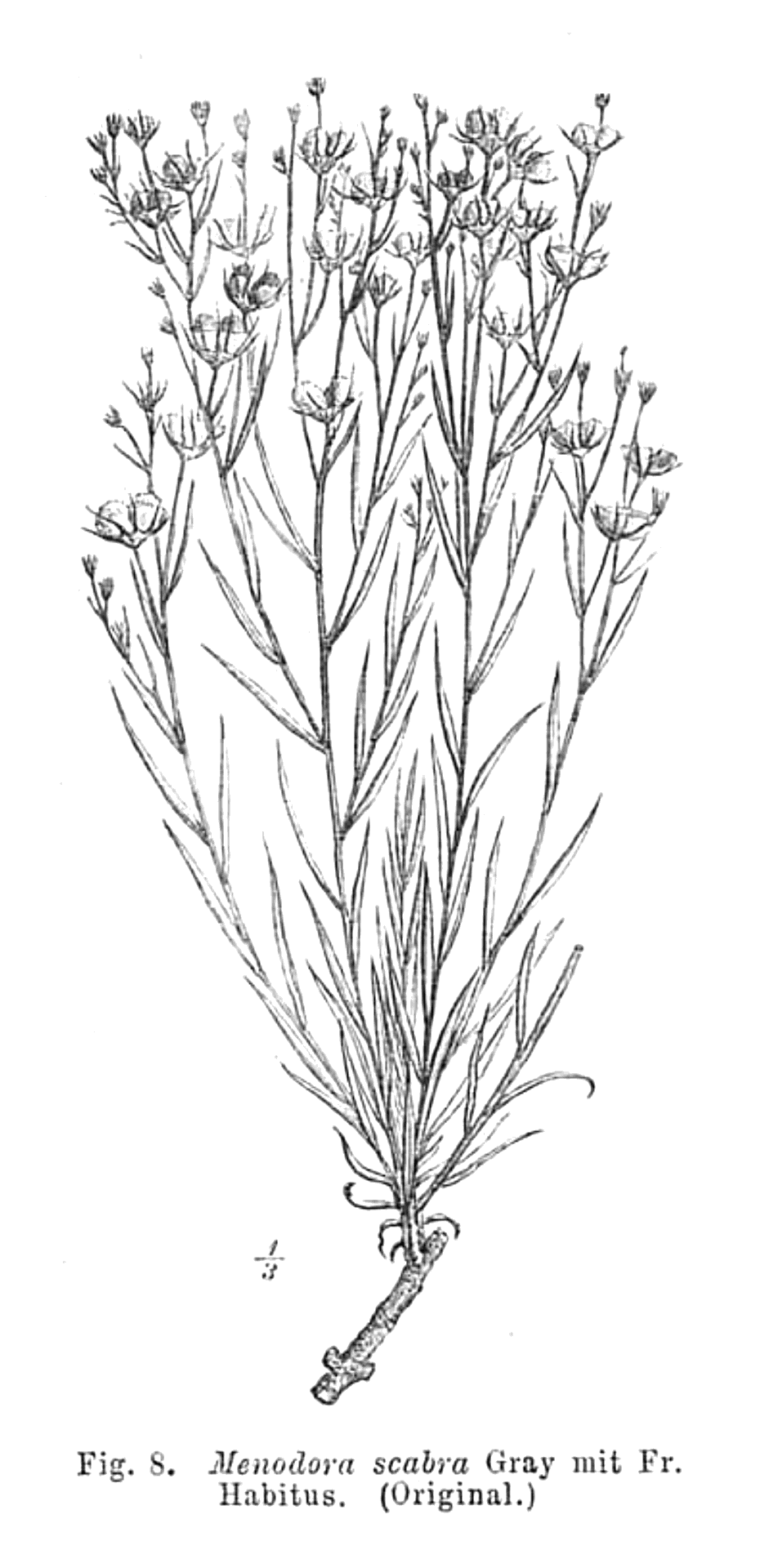
- Illustration circa 1895

Conservation status
- Secure (NatureServe)

Scientific classification
- Kingdom: Plantae
- Clade: Tracheophytes
- Clade: Angiosperms
- Clade: Eudicots
- Clade: Asterids
- Order: Lamiales
- Family: Oleaceae
- Genus: Menodora
- Species: M. scabra

Binomial name
- Menodora scabra Engelm. ex A.Gray

Synonyms
- Menodora decemfida var. longifolia Steyerm.; Menodora laevis Wooton & Standl.; Menodora scoparia Engelm. ex A.Gray

= Menodora scabra =

Rough menodora

Shrub species in the olive family

Menodora scabra (formerly Menodora scoparia) is broom-like shrub in the Olive Family (Oleaceae), known by the common name rough menodora or broom twinberry. It is a popular desert garden plant.

== Range and habit ==
It is native to the southwestern United States (Colorado, Arizona, Utah, New Mexico, Nevada, Texas and California) and northern Mexico (Coahuila, Durango, Nuevo León, Chihuahua, Sonora), where it grows in varied mountain, plateau, and desert habitat.

== Growth pattern ==
Menodora scabra is a small, multibranched subshrub producing several upright stems no more than 30 centimeters tall. It is coated in rough hairs and short, woolly fibers.

== Leaves and stem ==
The leaves are oblong or oval, smooth along the edges, and opposite on the lower parts of the stems, becoming alternate above. They are 1-3 cm long and 1-6 mm wide, the larger leaves located lower on the plant.

== Flowers and fruit ==
The inflorescence is a loose cluster of yellow flowers at the tip of a stem branch. The flower corolla has 4 to 6 lobes with the stamens and stigma protruding from the short throat. The fruit is a capsule.

== Ethnobotanical uses ==
Native American Navajo people developed cold infusion of this plant to treat heartburn and facilitate labor for childbirth. A root decoction was used to treat spinal pain.
