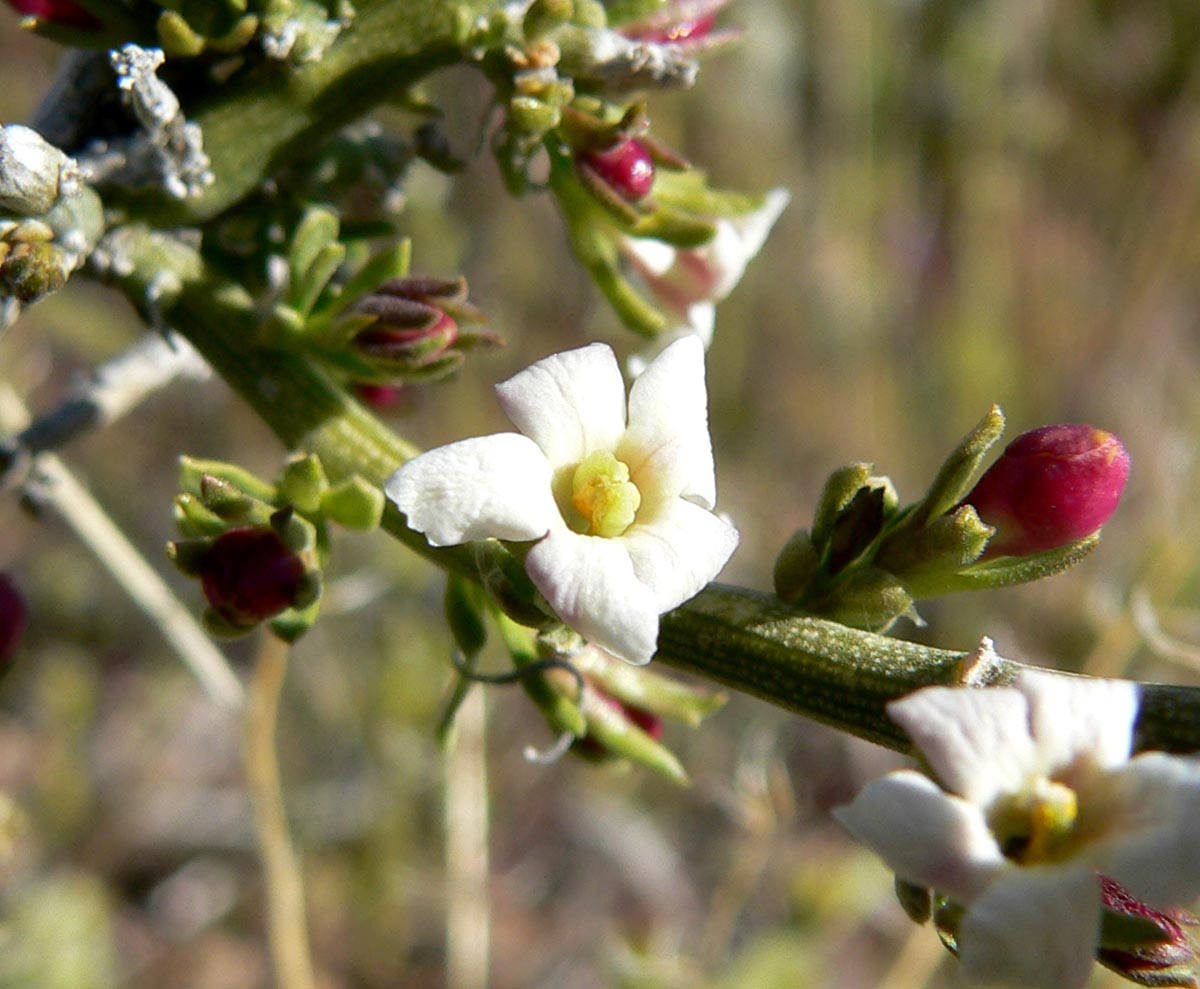
- M. spinescens

Scientific classification
- Kingdom: Plantae
- Clade: Tracheophytes
- Clade: Angiosperms
- Clade: Eudicots
- Clade: Asterids
- Order: Lamiales
- Family: Oleaceae
- Tribe: Jasmineae
- Genus: Menodora; Humb. and Bonpl.

Species
- See text

Synonyms
- Bolivaria Cham. & Schltdl. Calyptrospermum A.Dietr. Menodoropsis (A.Gray) Small

= Menodora =

Genus of flowering plants

Menodora is a genus of perennial plants and shrubs in the olive family Oleaceae. Its 23 species (as per Green 2003) are found in the temperate Americas and in southern Africa. These are uniform species of deserts and arid grasslands or savannas.

== Description ==
The usually bisexual flowers have a united calyx with 5-10 lobes (rarely more), while the corolla is similarly united but with 4-6 lobes. The corolla is a pretty, bright yellow (except for M. spinescens, whose corollas are white), and is often scented. The fruit is a didymous, bilobed capsule with each globose locule or lobe containing 2-4 seeds. In the majority of species, each locule also features circumscissile dehiscence. Vegetatively, the plants are generally unremarkable, with a "green-stick" look that is common to many desert plants. In the dry seasons, plants may lose their generally small or reduced leaves altogether. Leaf shape within the genus is highly variable, ranging from short and linear to almost feathery and pinnatisect. Leaves are most commonly found arranged in opposite pairs, but in some individuals may be predominantly alternate.

== Etymology ==
Willis Jepson mistakenly suggested that the origin of the genus name was rather obscure, perhaps deriving from the Greek for "half-moon spear" for the appearance of the dehisced fruit on its pedicel. In reality, the name was specifically derived from the Greek μενος (menos), meaning "force," and δωρον (doron), meaning "gift," referring to the sustenance the plants provided to the horses of Humboldt and Bonpland (1809) when they first encountered the genus in the present state of Hidalgo in Mexico.

== Selected species ==
- Menodora africana
- Menodora coulteri
- Menodora decemfida (Gill ex Hook. & Arn.) A.Gray – Tenfinger menodora
- Menodora gypsophila
- Menodora helianthemoides
- Menodora heterophylla Moric. ex DC. – Low menodora
- Menodora hintoniorum
- Menodora integrifolia (Cham. & Schltdl.) Steud.
- Menodora intricata
- Menodora jaliscana
- Menodora juncea
- Menodora linoides
- Menodora longiflora A.Gray – Showy menodora
- Menodora mexicana
- Menodora muellerae
- Menodora pulchella
- Menodora robusta
- Menodora scabra (formerly Menodora scoparia) A.Gray – Rough menodora
- Menodora scoparia
- Menodora spinescens A.Gray – Spiny menodora
- Menodora tehuacana
- Menodora yecorana

== Taxonomy ==
Menodora longiflora has occasionally been treated as the monotypic genus Menodoropsis (Small, 1903) due to the extraordinary length of its corolla tube (to nearly 6 cm, as opposed to typical lengths of 0.3 to 0.7 cm in most other species), but based on both morphological and molecular data it plainly belongs within Menodora. Small took the name for the genus from one of the sections of the Menodora recognized by Asa Gray (1852). Neither the sectional classification of Gray (1852) nor Steyermark (1932) have been upheld by recent molecular studies.

One of the more distinctive things about this genus is the pattern of disjunction or non-continuous distribution. In the Americas, the distribution jumps over the tropics, with only a few species whose individual distributions just cross into the tropics (e.g., north to central Bolivia, and south to Oaxaca in Mexico). This is a common pattern found in many genera, but not many others with a similar amphitropical distribution also have connections across the Atlantic with Africa. This intercontinental distribution of Menodora was often cited as evidence of continental drift or the breakup of the Pangaea or Gondwanan supercontinents, but more recently it has been judged to be the result of long distance dispersal.
