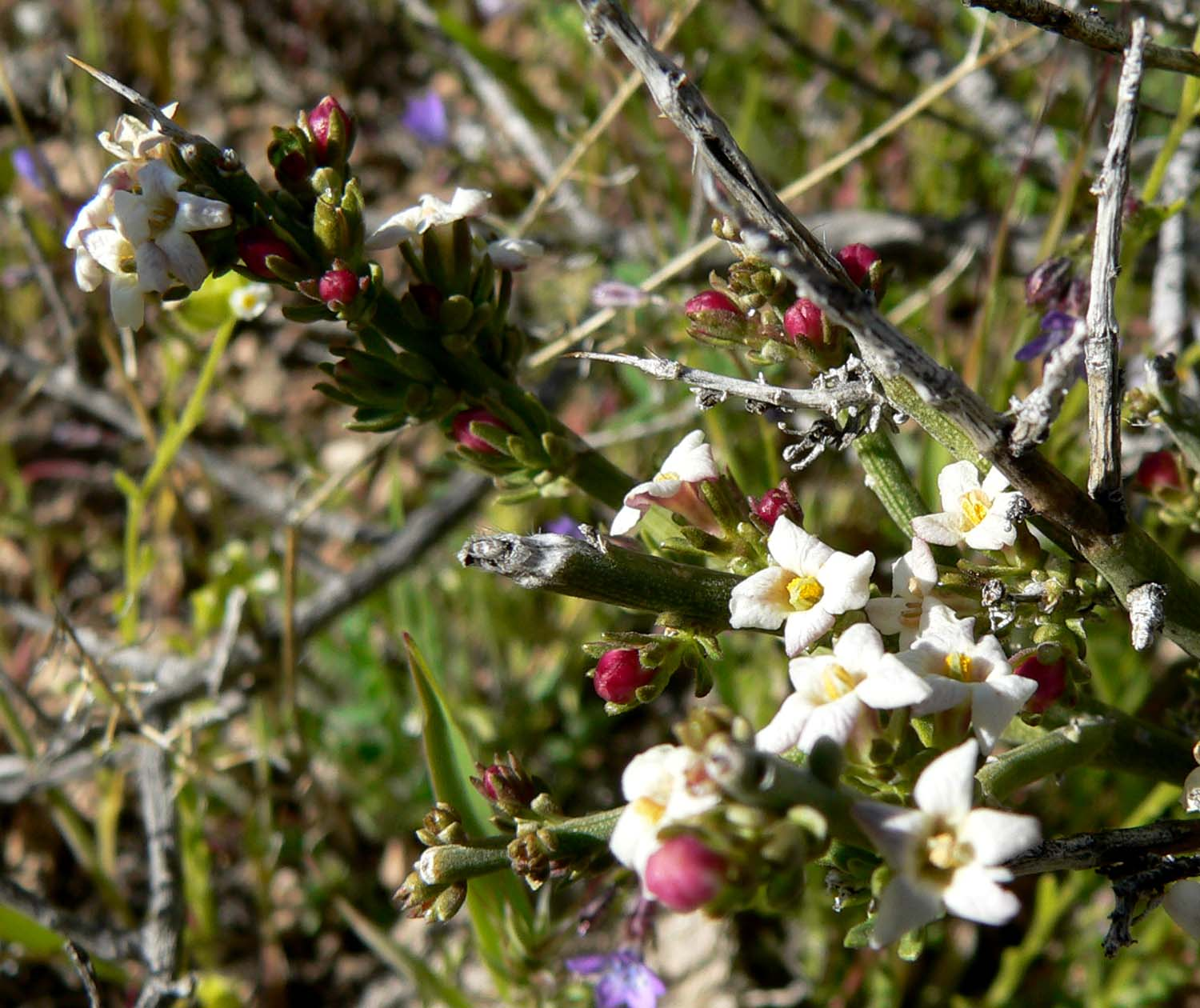

Scientific classification
- Kingdom: Plantae
- Clade: Tracheophytes
- Clade: Angiosperms
- Clade: Eudicots
- Clade: Asterids
- Order: Lamiales
- Family: Oleaceae
- Genus: Menodora
- Species: M. spinescens

Binomial name
- Menodora spinescens A.Gray

= Menodora spinescens =

Spiny menodora

Species of flowering plant

Menodora spinescens is a species of flowering plant in the olive family known by the common name spiny menodora. It is native to the southwestern United States, where it grows in varied mountain, canyon, and desert habitat in California, Nevada, Utah and Arizona.

Menodora spinescens is a shrub producing upright stems up to 90 centimeters tall, branching densely to form a thicket, the smallest branches tipped with spines. It is coated sparsely in short hairs. The fleshy green leaves are oblong or oval in shape, up to a centimeter long, and mostly borne in clusters. The inflorescence is a cluster of tube-throated flowers growing in axils, in splits between leaf clusters. The flowers are pink in bud and mostly white in bloom. The fruit is a capsule.
