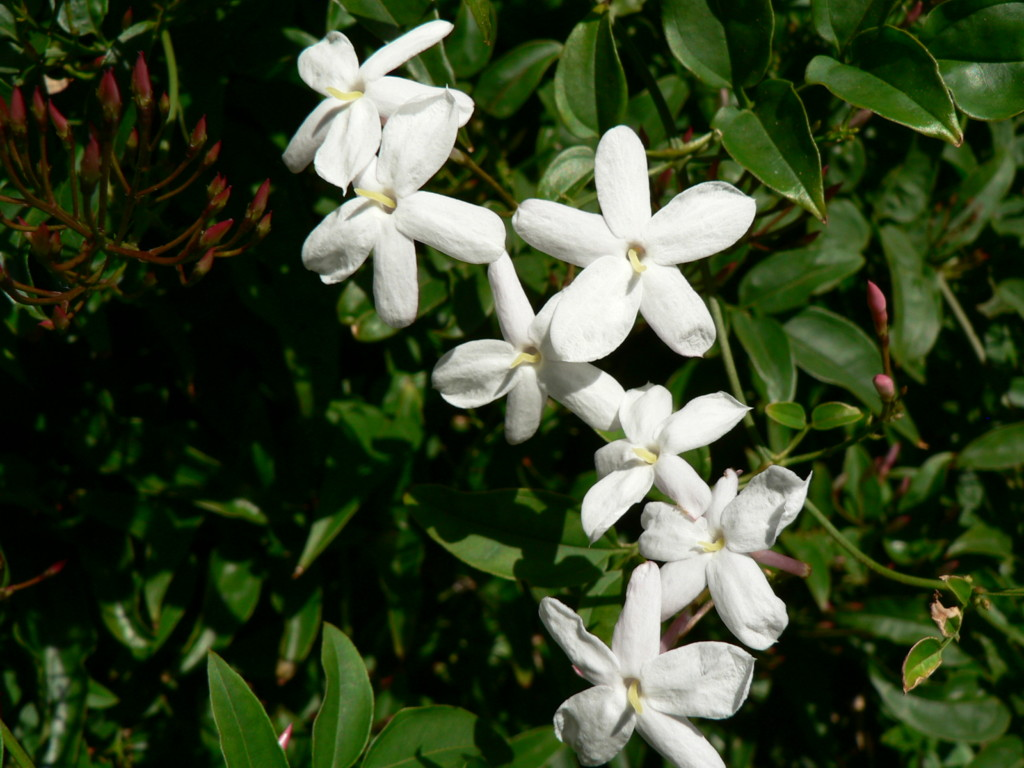
- Flowers of Jasminum polyanthum

Scientific classification
- Kingdom: Plantae
- Clade: Tracheophytes
- Clade: Angiosperms
- Clade: Eudicots
- Clade: Asterids
- Order: Lamiales
- Family: Oleaceae
- Tribe: Jasmineae

Genera
- Jasminum; Menodora; Chrysojasminum

= Jasmineae =

Tribe of flowering plants

Jasmineae is a tribe of flowering plants in the olive family, Oleaceae.

== Genera ==
- Jasminum L. - Jasmines
- Menodora Humb. & Bonpl.
- Chrysojasminum
