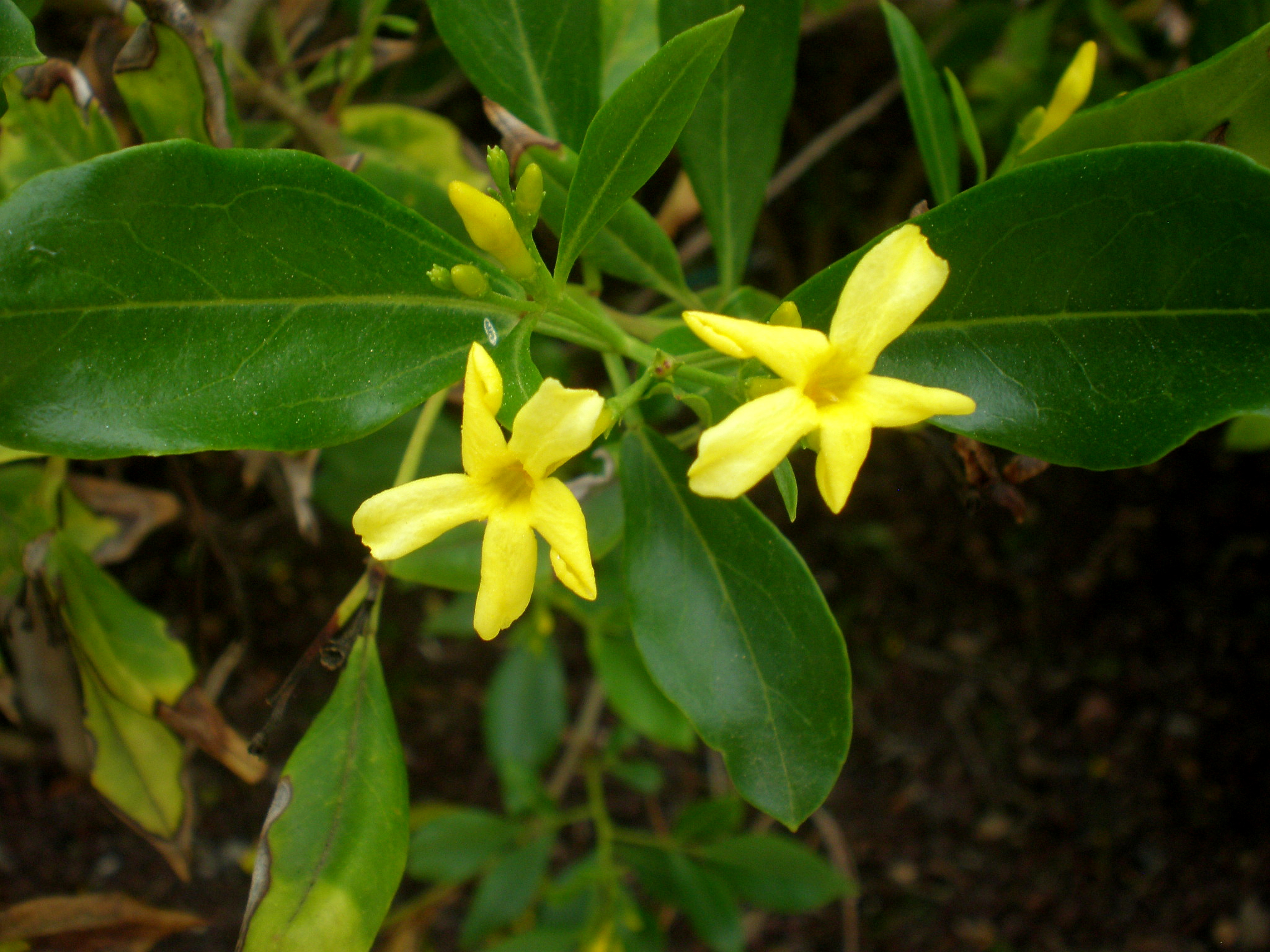
- Close-up of flowers
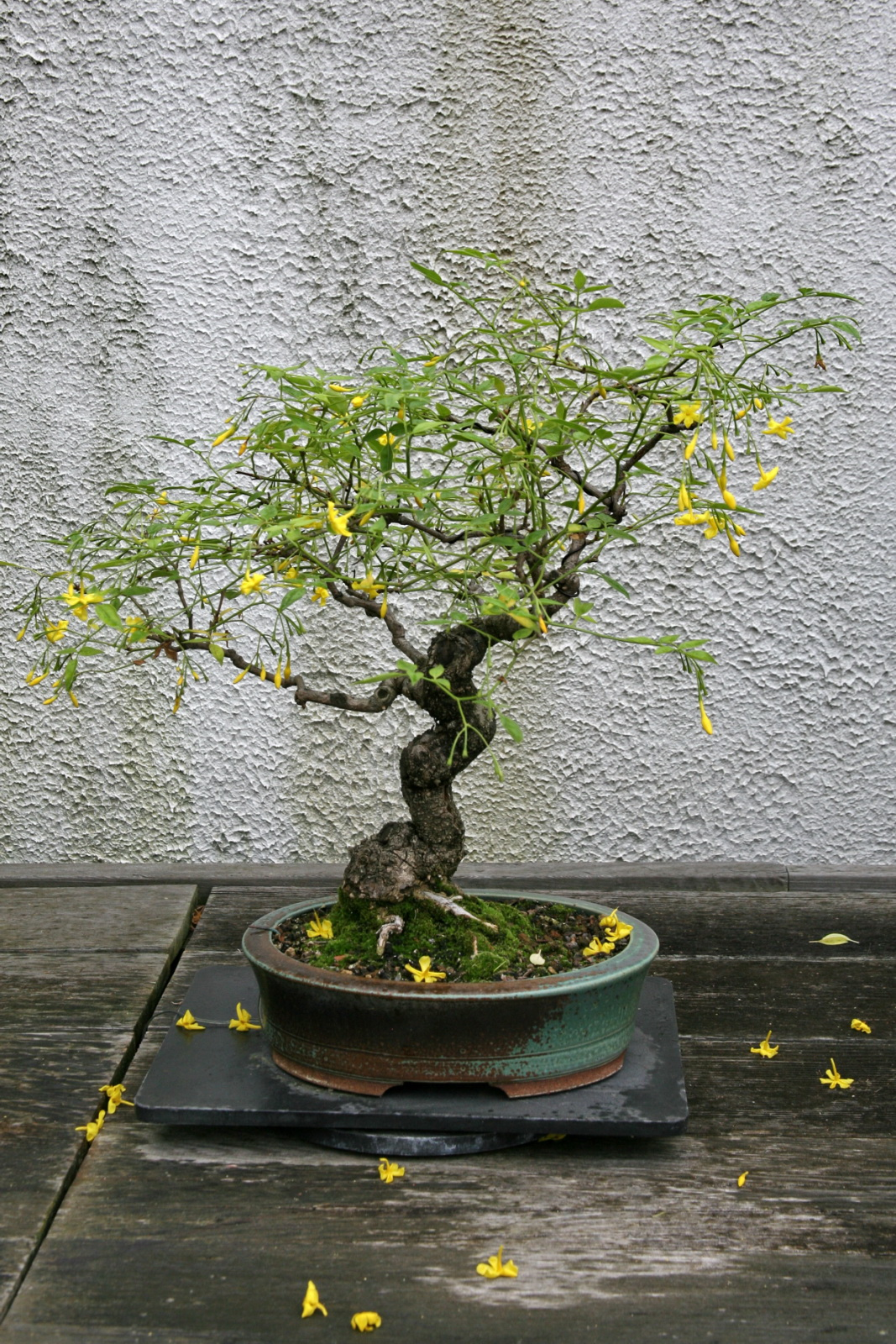
- A bonsai specimen

Scientific classification
- Kingdom: Plantae
- Clade: Tracheophytes
- Clade: Angiosperms
- Clade: Eudicots
- Clade: Asterids
- Order: Lamiales
- Family: Oleaceae
- Genus: Chrysojasminum
- Species: C. odoratissimum

Binomial name
- Chrysojasminum odoratissimum (L.) Banfi

Synonyms
- List: Jasminum augeronii A.Cabrera; Jasminum barrelieri Webb & Berthel.; Jasminum barrelieri var. angustifolium Pit.; Jasminum barrelieri var. latifolium Pit.; Jasminum gomeraeum Gand. in Bull. Soc. Bot. Franc; Jasminum odoratissimum L.; Jasminum odorum Salisb.

= Chrysojasminum odoratissimum =

Species of plant

Chrysojasminum odoratissimum, the fragrant jasmine, is a species of flowering plant in the family Oleaceae. It is native to Madeira and the Canary Islands. A scrambling evergreen climber reaching 2.5 m (8 ft), under its synonym Jasminum odoratissimum it has gained the Royal Horticultural Society's Award of Garden Merit as a wall shrub.
