= Stanthorpe Soldiers Memorial =

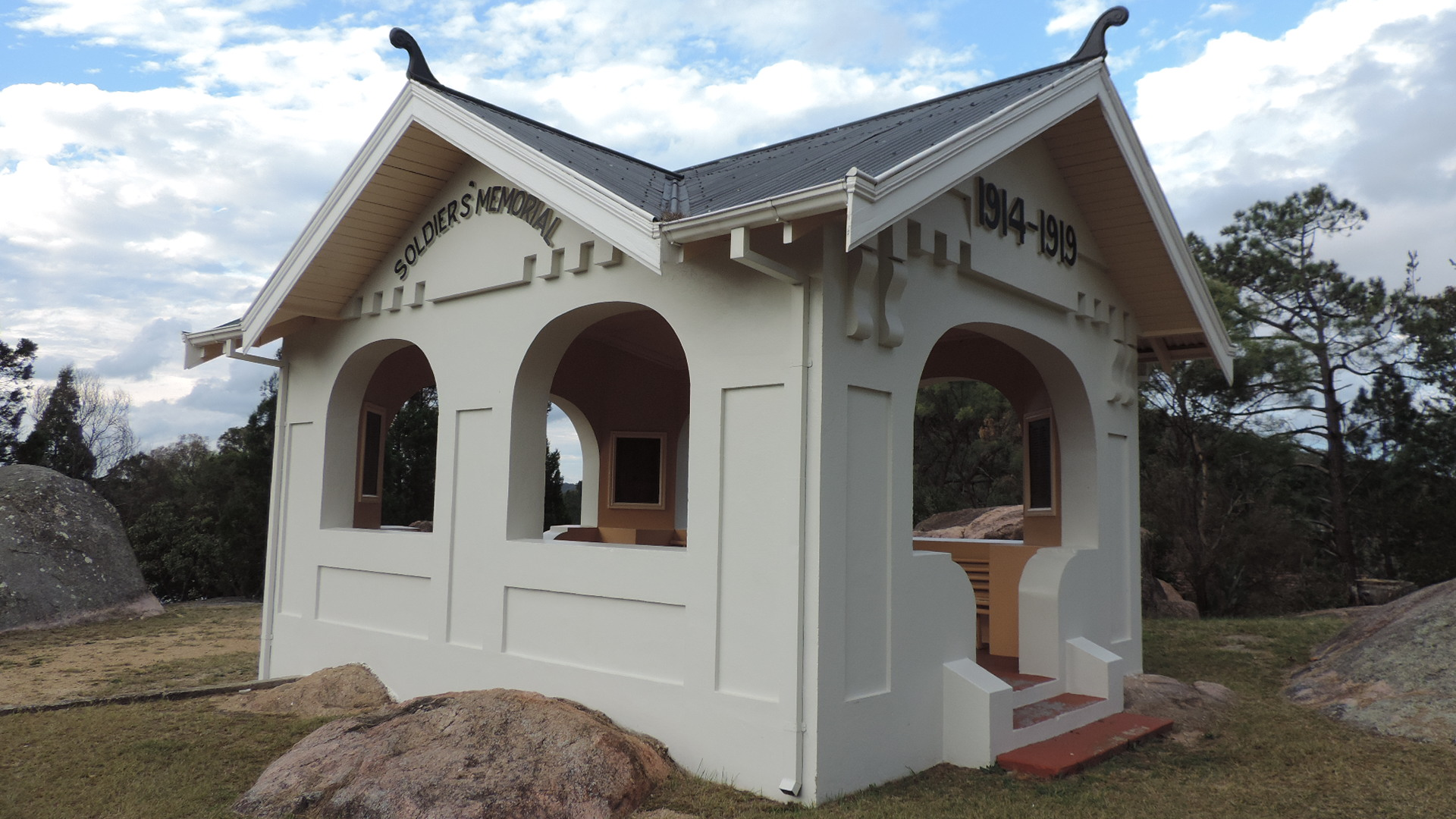
- Stanthorpe Soldiers Memorial, 2015

- Location within Queensland Location within Australia
- 28.6561°S 151.9406°E
- Location: Lock Street, Stanthorpe, Southern Downs Region, Queensland, Australia

History
- Design period: 1919–1930s (interwar period)
- Built: 1925–1926

Site notes
- Architect: Dornbusch & Connolly

Queensland Heritage Register
- Official name: Stanthorpe Soldiers Memorial, Stanthorpe War Memorial
- Type: state heritage (landscape, built)
- Designated: 3 August 1995
- Reference no.: 601632
- Significant period: 1920s (fabric)
- Significant components: flagpole/flagstaff, memorial – pavilion, steps/stairway, memorial – tree/avenue of trees, plaque, wall/s – retaining, pathway/walkway, terracing, memorial – honour board/ roll of honour, trees/plantings, furniture/fittings, seating
- Builders: N J Thompson & Sons

Stanthorpe Soldiers Memorial is a heritage-listed war memorial at Lock Street, Stanthorpe, Southern Downs Region, Queensland, Australia. It was designed by Dornbusch & Connolly and built from 1925 to 1926 by N J Thompson & Sons. It is also known as Stanthorpe War Memorial. It was unveiled on 6 February 1926, by Sir William Glasgow, K.C.G. It was added to the Queensland Heritage Register on 3 August 1995.

== History ==
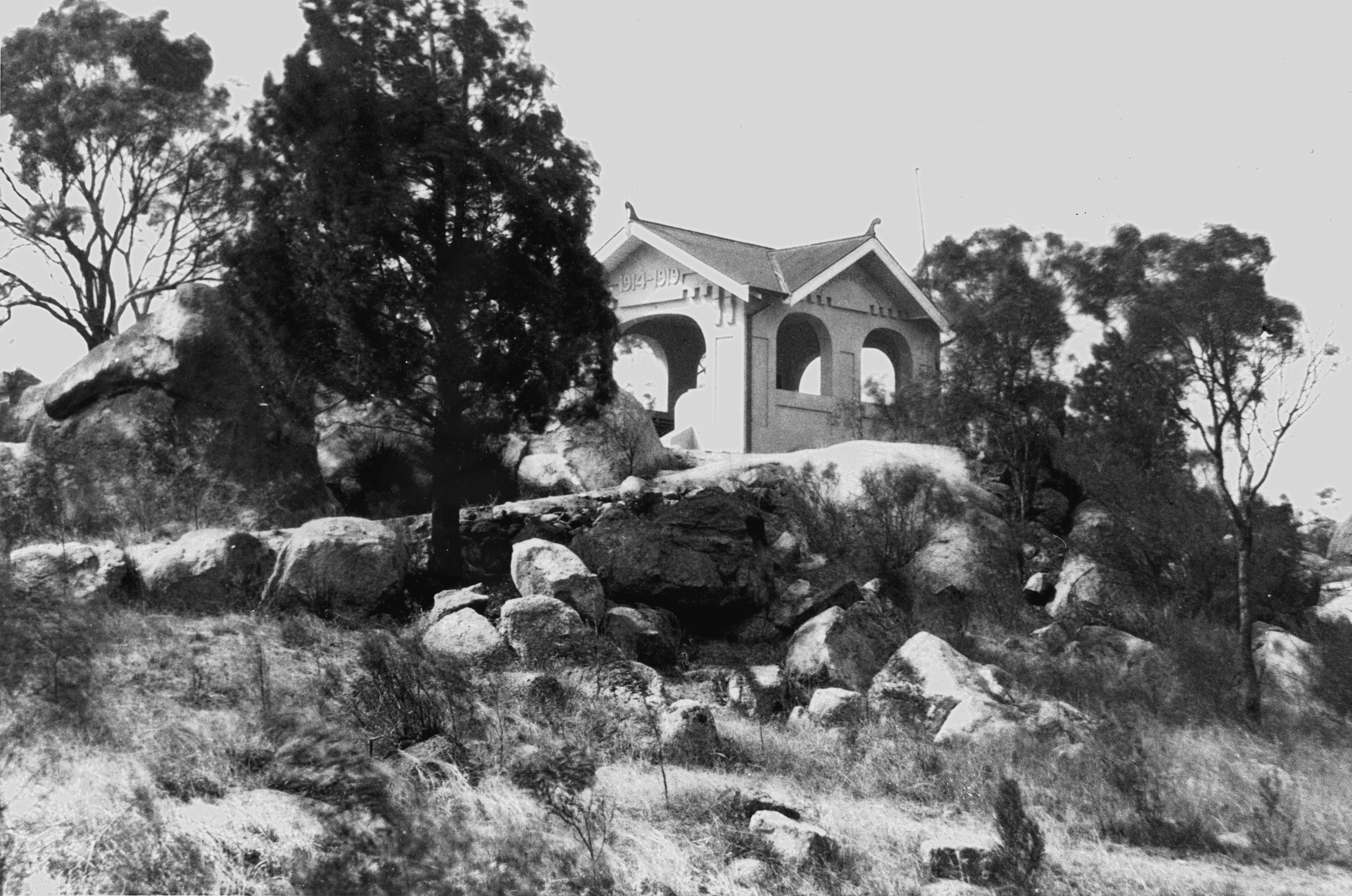
Soldiers Memorial built on the hill at Stanthorpe after World War I

Built in honour of the soldiers of the district who participated in the Great War, the Stanthorpe Soldiers' Memorial was funded, as with many other such memorials across the state, by public subscription. Stanthorpe's memorial took the form of a park and rest house located on Foxton's Hill described at the time by The Queenslander as one of the lonely hills overlooking Stanthorpe. The rest house was designed by Warwick architects Dornbush and Connolly and built by local contractors NJ Thompson and Sons; inside were seats and on the walls, five rolls of honour, one of which was reserved for the fallen. The Soldiers' Memorial was officially opened on 6 February 1926 by Major General Sir William Glasgow, a commander of campaigns in Gallipoli and also in France, whose battlefields were to be memorialised in Australia by the naming of the towns of the soldier settlement area (Amiens, Pozieres, Bullecourt, and Fleurbaix) established near Stanthorpe soon after the War.

The first meeting to consider the erection of an honour board or soldiers memorial in Stanthorpe was held on 1 December 1918; a committee was formed to raise funds. The committee considered a possible site at Mt Marlay, the major lookout point for the town, however this was later rejected and by 1921, suggestions were being sought for other suitable schemes. Mr Fletcher favoured erecting a memorial on the proposed new cricket grounds; Mr Corden favoured a block of land owned by ER Hopper situated close to town and on a high position on Foxton's Hill which could be bought at a reasonable price; CF White suggested a rest house on the Hopper land and also using the land as a memorial park by erecting seats in convenient spots for the public. A public meeting was called resulting in the memorial committee agreeing on 21 May 1921 to pay a deposit on the Foxton Hill site and a committee was formed to draw up a development scheme for the park. It was proposed that Dornbusch and Connolly be asked to prepare plans of a rest house and submit estimates.

The site chosen was rough and rocky: the main park area (sub 22 now lot 33) fronted Lock Street with two smaller allotments (subs 5 and 6 now lots 16 and 17) fronting White Street. In 1923, the memorial site was formally acquired by the Committee, being held in the names of Charles Frederick White, James Vincent Scully, and Harry Wright. In September of that year, Dornbusch and Connolly were asked to prepare specifications in both local stone and concrete and tenders were to be called. Apparently due to lack of funds work on the rest house did not in fact commence until 1925. The memorial site was however already marked as such: a Turkish gun believed to have been brought to Australia as a war trophy by the commander of the Light Horse, Sir Harry Chauvel and his brother, Major Alan Chauvel (whose family summer house, "El Arish", adjoined the memorial site) was placed at what became the Lock Street entrance to the memorial. This entrance was also to be marked by a sign, a fence, and a stile.

It is not known if landscaping and planting was undertaken at the site prior to the erection of the rest house. Certainly by the 1930s photographs show that pines (believed to be Lone Pines) had been planted around the rest house; pines had also been planted on the western slopes of the site (adjoining "El Arish"). Wooden pegs (now lost) which recorded the names of fallen servicemen were placed below the memorial trees. By 1933, a blue light shone at night from the memorial making it visible from the town centre. Two memorial eucalypts were planted at the Scholz Street entrance which was also fenced. More recently, in the 1980s, the floor of the rest house was painted over to cover a "flag" and the pressed metal ceiling painted blue and stars affixed. The Turkish Gun has also been removed and now stands in front of the RSL building. In 1995 a timber fence and stile were removed from the White Street frontage.

For many years, Anzac Day was commemorated in Stanthorpe by a number of events commencing with a Dawn Service at the Soldiers Memorial, morning services at the various churches, and in the afternoon, a public service held at the Arcadia Theatre preceded by a march through the streets by returned soldiers. Afternoon tea was provided by the CWA for the families of returned service personnel. In more recent times the Dawn Service has been held at Weeroona Park.

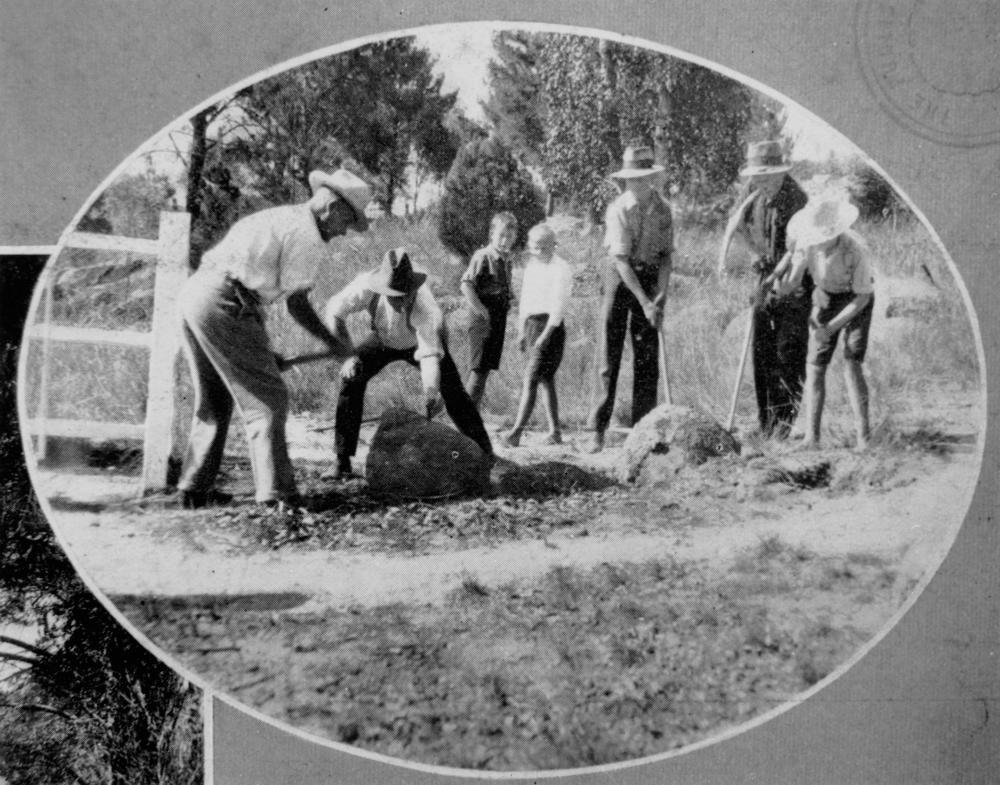
Working bee at the War Memorial Park Stanthorpe, March 1933

Until 1963, when the memorial was transferred to the Stanthorpe Shire Council, it was maintained by public donations, including those collected for its upkeep at the annual Anzac Day Service. There also exists a long tradition of service to the memorial by local people (often returned servicemen) who were responsible for not only maintaining the memorial but also for the landscaping and planting of its grounds. These included Mr AH Hocking (who conducted working bees during the 1930s), Mr and Mrs AE Bateman, Mr Barton, Mr Ted Knight, Mr Jim Robertson, and during the 1980s, Mr Robert Dekeersgieter; more recently a local group, the Friends of the War Memorial and Local Residents Association has been formed.

Stanthorpe Shire Cultural Heritage Study report – The Stanthorpe Soldiers Memorial was built in 1926 to a design concept by architects Dornbusch and Connolly. The 6.15-by-4.6-metre (20.2 ft × 15.1 ft) building housed five Honour Rolls and after WWII the sixth was placed in the building. Further honour boards have been added to mark conflicts in which Australians have participated. The ground around the building has been landscaped.

== Description ==
Located on Foxtons Hill a short distance from the Stanthorpe town centre the Stanthorpe Soldiers' Memorial is a rugged parkland of some one and a half hectares crossed by walking paths leading to a rest house at the top of the hill. The site is bounded to the north by Lock Street and on the remaining sides by residential allotments including "El Arish" along part of the western boundary. The main entrance is from Lock Street; access can also be obtained from White Street via lots 16 and 17 and from Scholz Street to the south, the entry of which is marked by two large eucalypts which frame the view of the rest house up a long slope.

The site is rugged and rocky with exposed granite boulders and mixed vegetation. Landscaping is in a naturalistic manner with bush pathways (and some sets of concrete stairs), seats cut out of the rock along some paths, and stone walling and terracing. There is evidence of some formal planting along the pathways including yellow jasmine hedges. The site also contains a number of memorial trees including what are believed to be several Lone Pines which surround the rest house and stands of pines on the western edge of the site.

From Lock Street, the rest house is approached by several sets of concrete stairs on a path leading up the hill from the road. The rest house is set amongst exposed granite boulders on a flat site at the summit of the hill. There is a flagpole to the south and retaining walls and stairs to the south and west. Set on an east–west axis with views through arched openings including to the west, a panorama of Stanthorpe and the surrounding district, the rest house is a white painted concrete pavilion with a painted corrugated roof gabled in four directions. On the east and west gables in concrete raised lettering is the inscription "SOLDIERS' MEMORIAL"; on the north and south gables "1914–19".

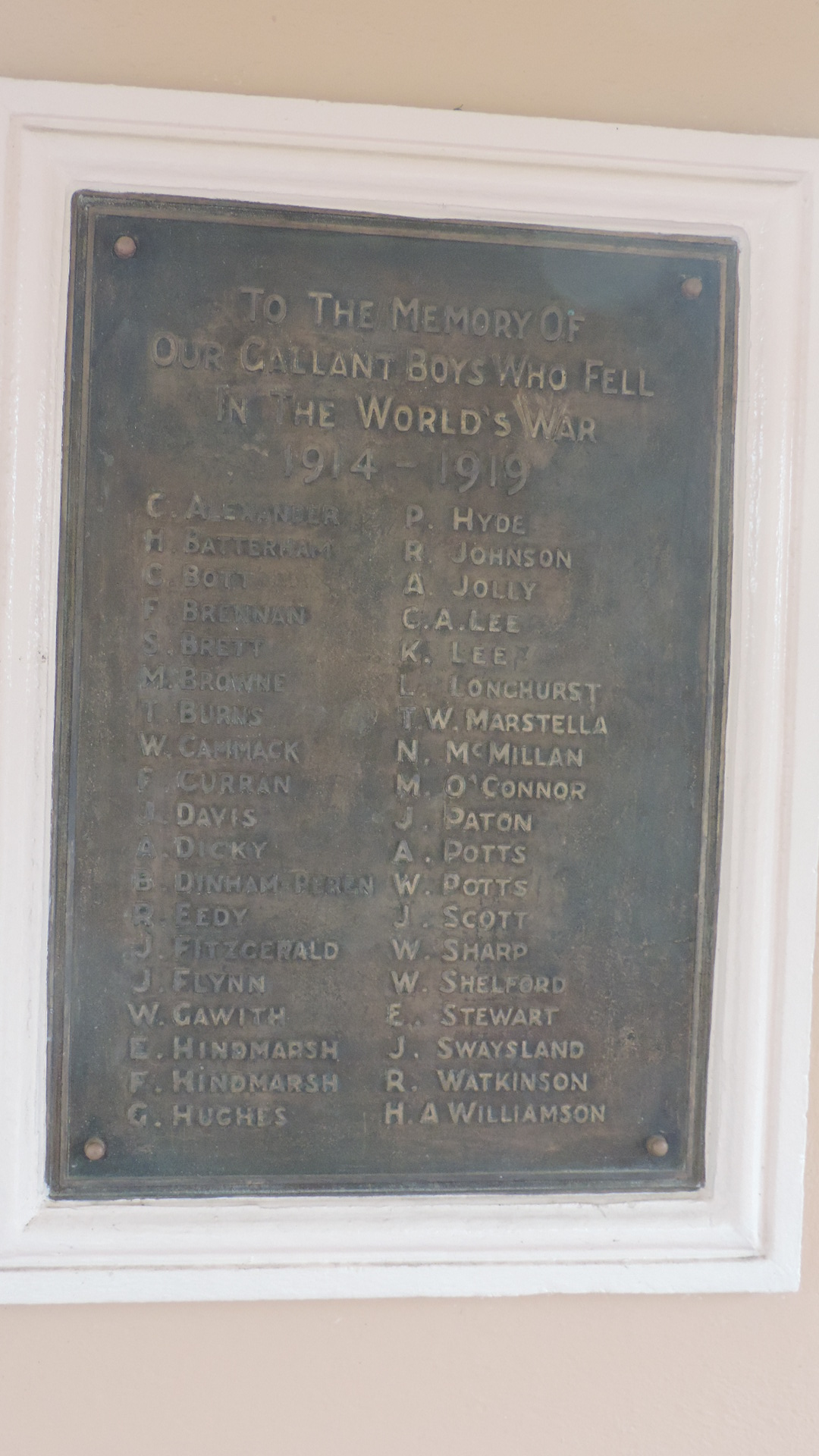
One of the plaques listing names

The rest house is entered via arched openings to the north and south elevations. Inside the ceiling is pressed metal painted powder blue with gold plastic stars affixed; the floor has been painted red. Along the east and west walls are two long timber slatted seats. On the walls are five World War I honour boards of metal set into concrete mouldings, one of which is reserved for the names of the dead. In raised letters it reads: "TO THE MEMORY OF OUR GALLANT BOYS WHO FELL IN THE WORLD'S WAR 1914–1919". The boards record the names in alphabetical order with no military ranks or honours indicated. There is also an honour board for World War II and a plaque for Korea.

== Heritage listing ==
Stanthorpe Soldiers Memorial was listed on the Queensland Heritage Register on 3 August 1995 having satisfied the following criteria.

The place is important in demonstrating the evolution or pattern of Queensland's history.

Located on Foxton's Hill overlooking the town and surrounding district of Stanthorpe, the Soldiers' Memorial comprising a rest house set within a rugged park is a remarkable memorial having no apparent parallel in the state. In common with many other memorials erected across the country, the Stanthorpe Soldiers' Memorial was a prominent focal point for the town, however it is highly unusual in that it was not set within the town's centre, but rather on its outskirts: the memorial was thus a place of public memory and also of private pilgrimage.

The place demonstrates rare, uncommon or endangered aspects of Queensland's cultural heritage.

Located on Foxton's Hill overlooking the town and surrounding district of Stanthorpe, the Soldiers' Memorial comprising a rest house set within a rugged park is a remarkable memorial having no apparent parallel in the state. In common with many other memorials erected across the country, the Stanthorpe Soldiers' Memorial was a prominent focal point for the town, however it is highly unusual in that it was not set within the town's centre, but rather on its outskirts: the memorial was thus a place of public memory and also of private pilgrimage.

The place is important in demonstrating the principal characteristics of a particular class of cultural places.

With its memorial plantings and naturalistic landscaping including rock seats and walls and bush paths leading up the hill to the rest house, positioned so as to view the rising and the setting of the sun through its archways, the memorial is clearly intended as a place of both commemoration and contemplation.

The place is important because of its aesthetic significance.

The site, with its rough terrain and exposed granite boulders common to the region retains its wilderness quality as a stark landscape which is both peculiarly local, but also on a grander scale, making apparent symbolic reference to Gallipoli and the Turkish coast.

The place has a strong or special association with a particular community or cultural group for social, cultural or spiritual reasons.

The Stanthorpe Soldiers Memorial is a memorial to those who served in the Great (and other later) wars but is also a testament to the community who built the memorial and remain as its custodians.

The place has a special association with the life or work of a particular person, group or organisation of importance in Queensland's history.

The Stanthorpe Soldiers Memorial is a memorial to those who served in the Great (and other later) wars but is also a testament to the community who built the memorial and remain as its custodians.
