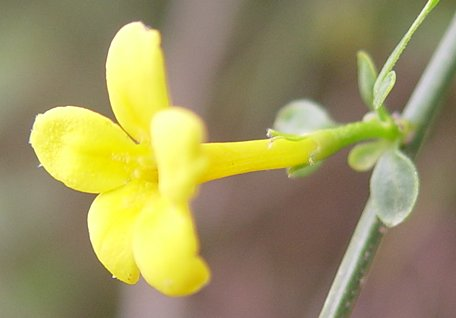
- Close-up of flower
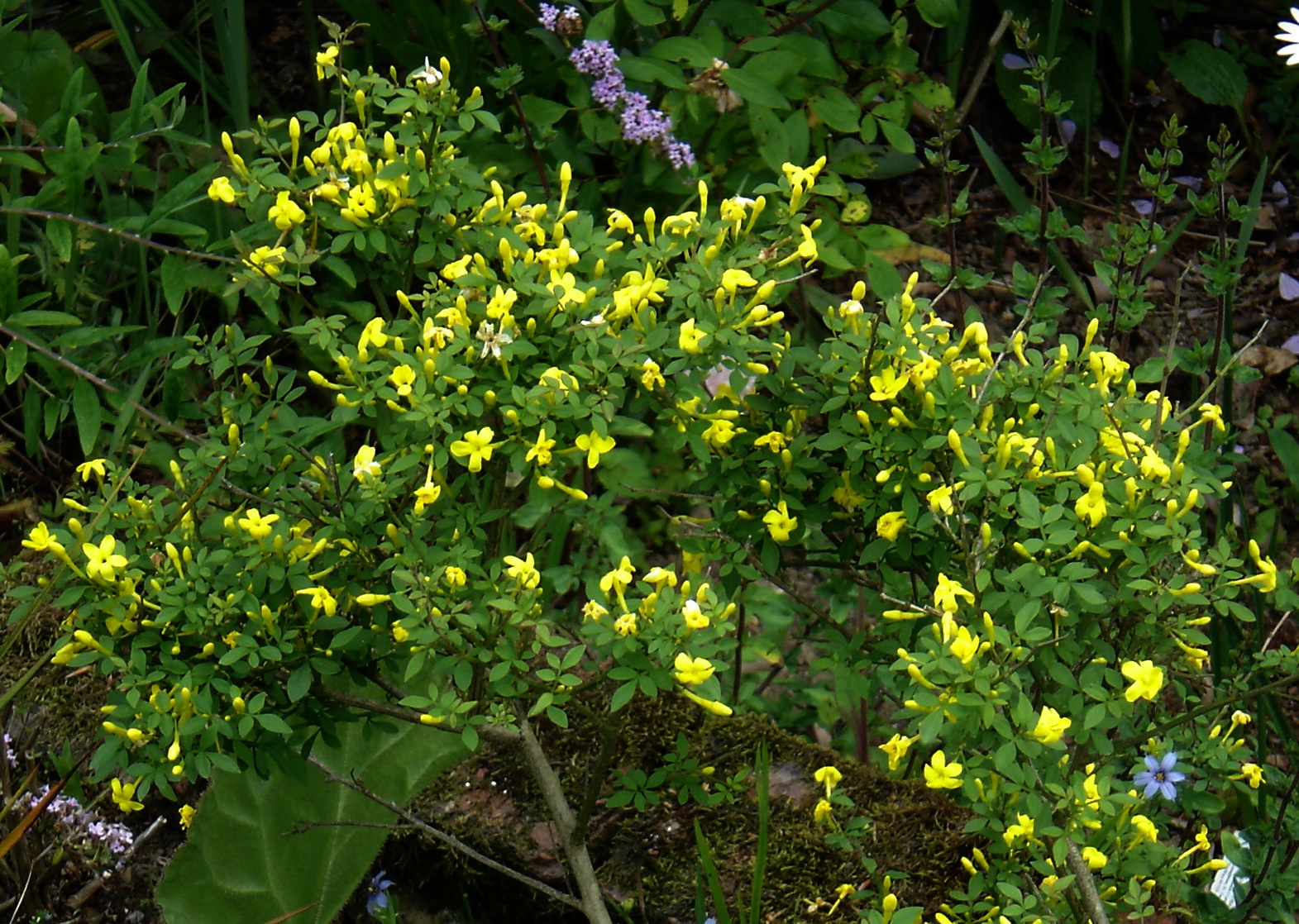
- Habit

Scientific classification
- Kingdom: Plantae
- Clade: Tracheophytes
- Clade: Angiosperms
- Clade: Eudicots
- Clade: Asterids
- Order: Lamiales
- Family: Oleaceae
- Genus: Chrysojasminum
- Species: C. fruticans

Binomial name
- Chrysojasminum fruticans (L.) Banfi

Synonyms
- List: Jasminum collinum Salisb.; Jasminum frutescens Gueldenst.; Jasminum fruticans L.; Jasminum fruticans var. mariae (Sennen & Mauricio) Sennen & Mauricio; Jasminum fruticans subsp. mariae (Sennen & Mauricio) Sennen & Mauricio; Jasminum fruticans var. simplicifolium Stokes; Jasminum fruticans var. speciosum E.Rev. & Debeaux; Jasminum fruticans var. syriacum (Boiss. & Gaill.) Hayek; Jasminum fruticosum Willd.; Jasminum heterophyllum Moench; Jasminum humile Gueldenst.; Jasminum luteum Gueldenst.; Jasminum mariae Sennen & Mauricio; Jasminum syriacum Boiss. & Gaill.

= Chrysojasminum fruticans =

Species of plant

Chrysojasminum fruticans (syn. Jasminum fruticans), known as the wild jasmine or common yellow jasmine, is a species of flowering plant in the family Oleaceae, native to the Mediterranean region and the Middle East as far as northern Iran. It is the only native jasmineae species in Europe. It is a semi-evergreen shrub with yellow flowers and black berries.

== Description ==
Alternate, trifoliate leaves and yellow flowers, about 15 mm long. The flowers are typically in clusters at the end of the branches, 2 to 4 flowers per cluster. The flowers produce nectar and they have been reported to last 3 days. The plan fruits in autumn; the berry is small (0.5 - 0.8 cm in diameter), round and black.

=== Floral Morphology & Reproduction ===
This species is known to display heterostyly, with two different morphs: short-styled (short style & long stamens) & long-styled (long style & short stamens).

The plant commonly spreads clonally, through its rhizomes. The plants are self-incompatible (cannot self pollinate) and within-morph incompatible (pollination within the same morph does not produce viable seed).

== Uses ==
The wild jasmine is commonly used as an ornamental shrub. It is listed as non-toxic for cats and dogs.

== Ecology ==
This species is typically found in calcareous soils.

Red deer showed a high preference for this species in a foraging study. Iberian ibexes have also been found feeding on this species.

Wild jasmine is visited by a wide range of pollinators, including Hymenoptera (such as bees), Diptera (such as bee-flies) and Lepidoptera (such as hawkmoths). No difference was found in the visitation rate of pollinators based on the flower morph.

Paper wasps (Polistes gallicus) have been found to nest in wild jasmines. Wild jasmines are one of the three host species of the olive leaf moth, Palpita unionalis.

== Cultural Significance ==
- The wild jasmine is mentioned as a medicinal plant in one of Al-Biruni's works.
- The plant appears in 9 traditional songs of Castilla y Leon.
- The flowers are a motif in Turkish traditional silk based needlework.

== Gallery ==
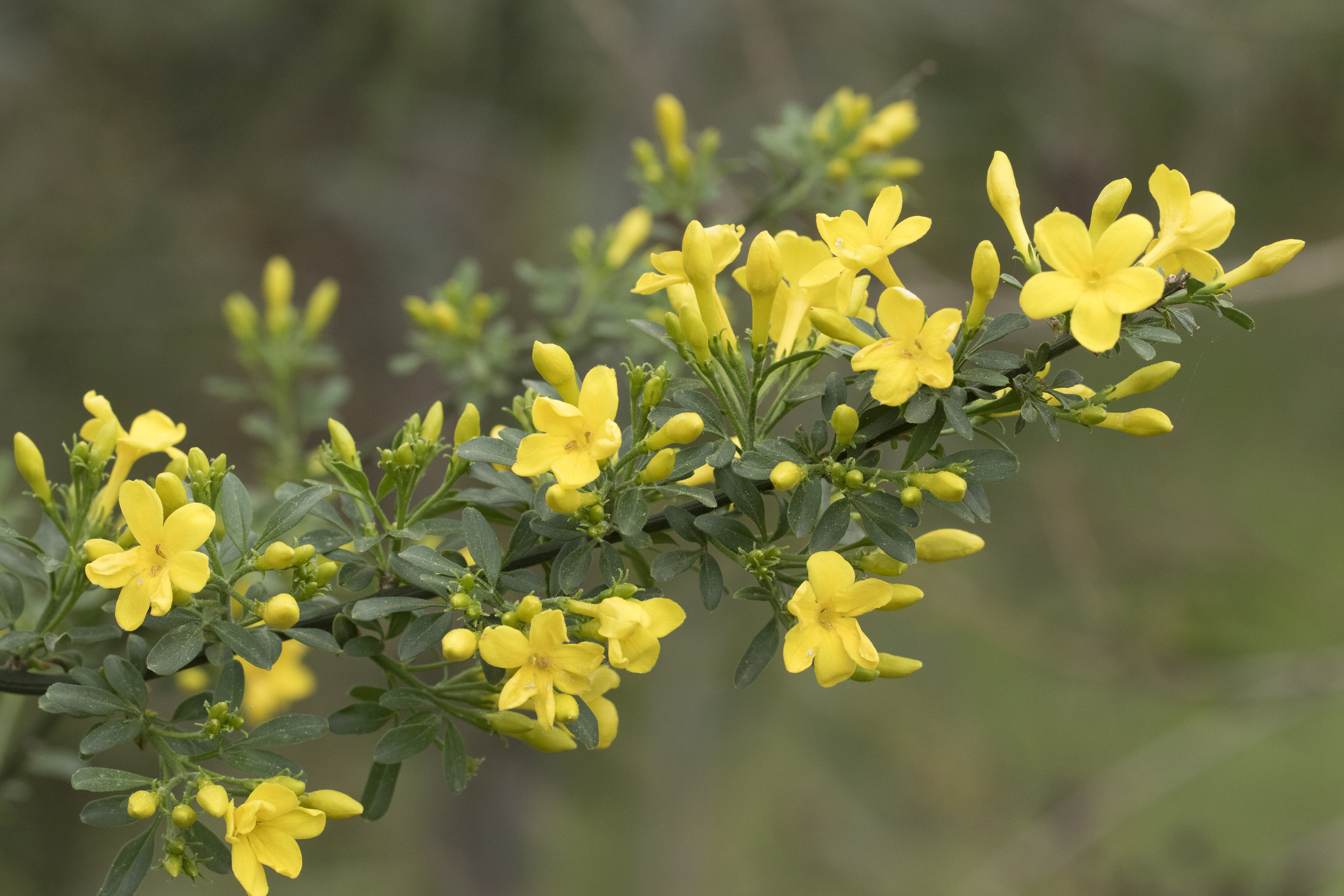
A branch full with flowers and flower buds

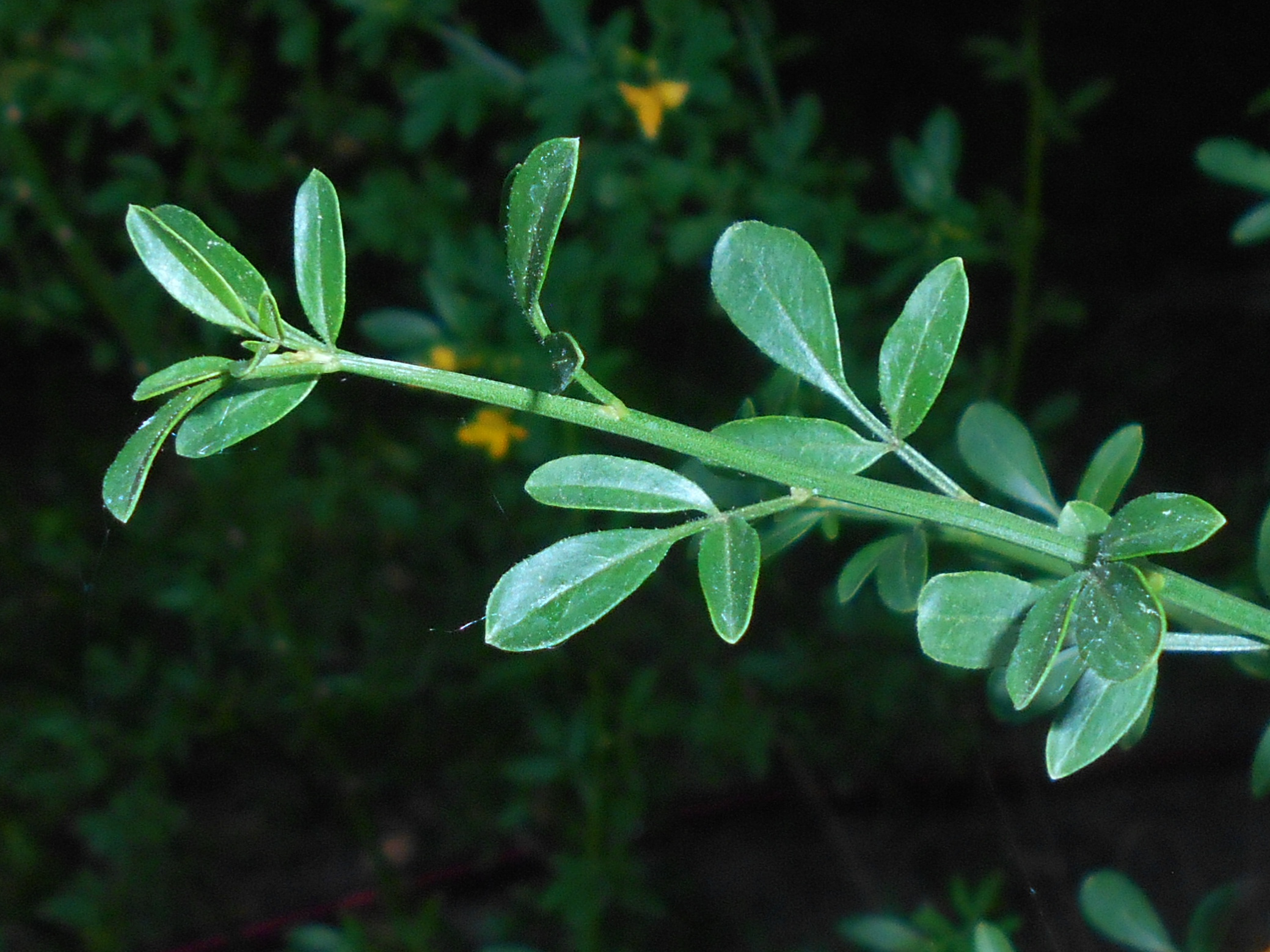
Branch with leaves

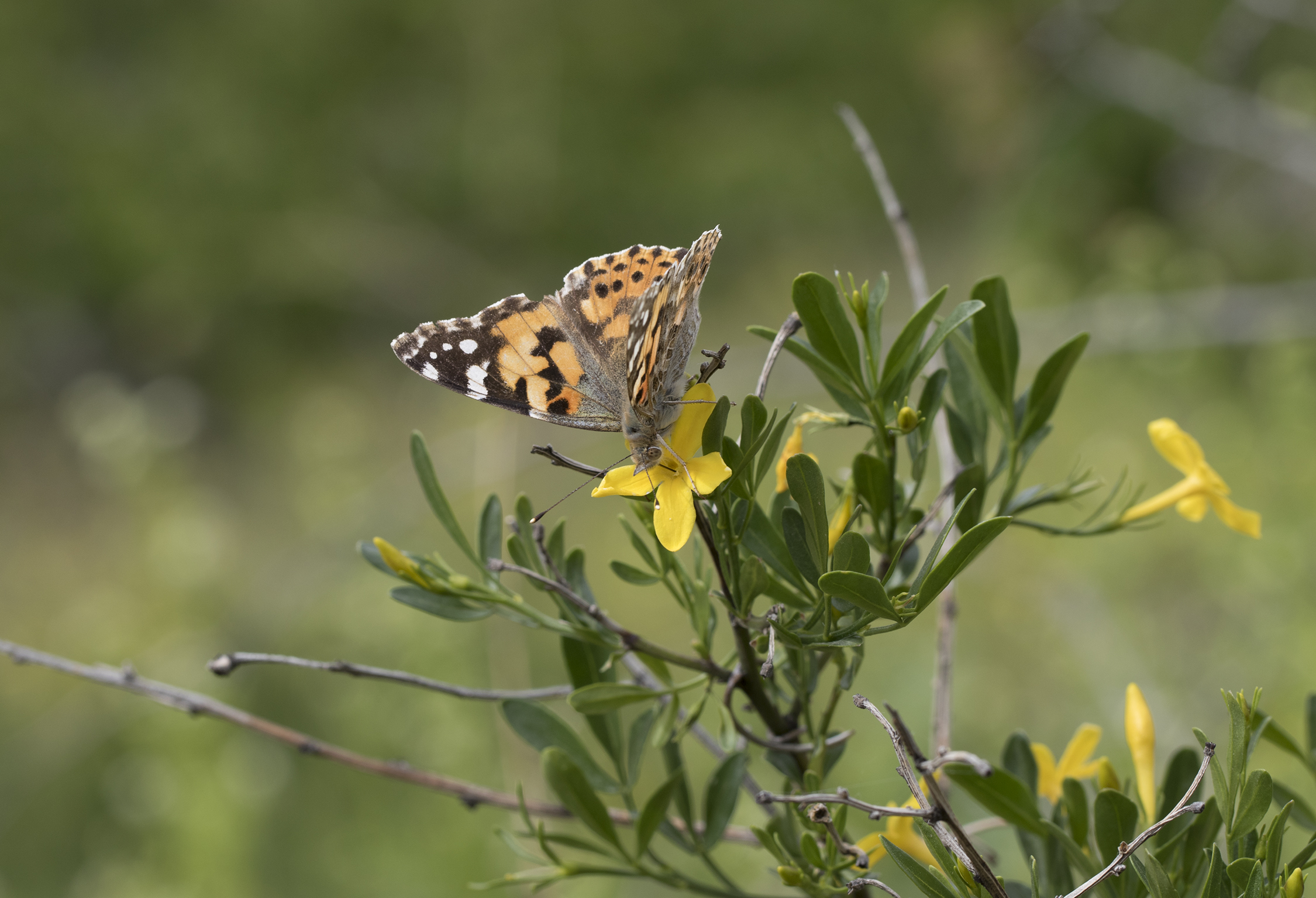
Butterfly drinking nectar from jasmine flower

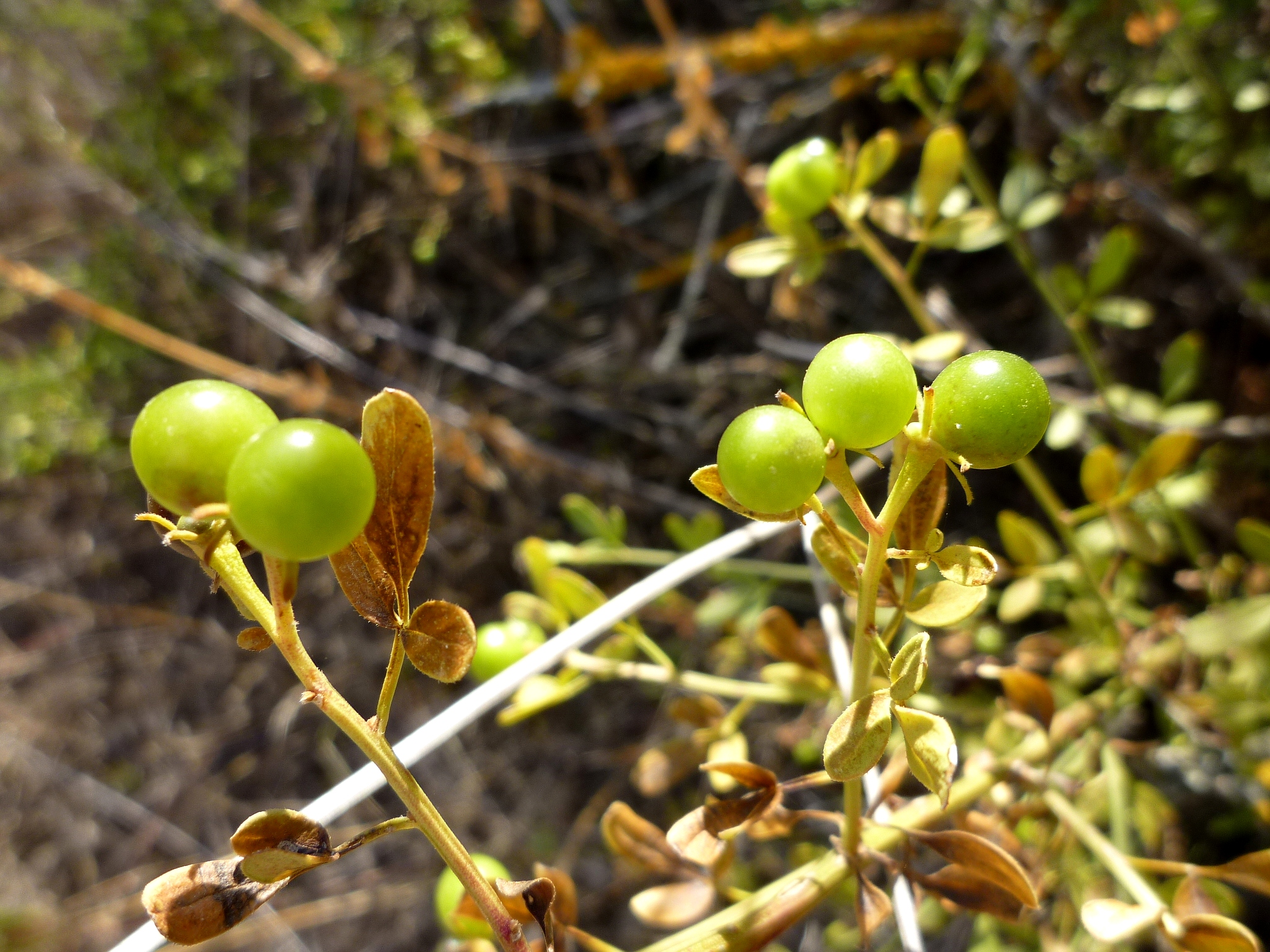
Unripe fruits

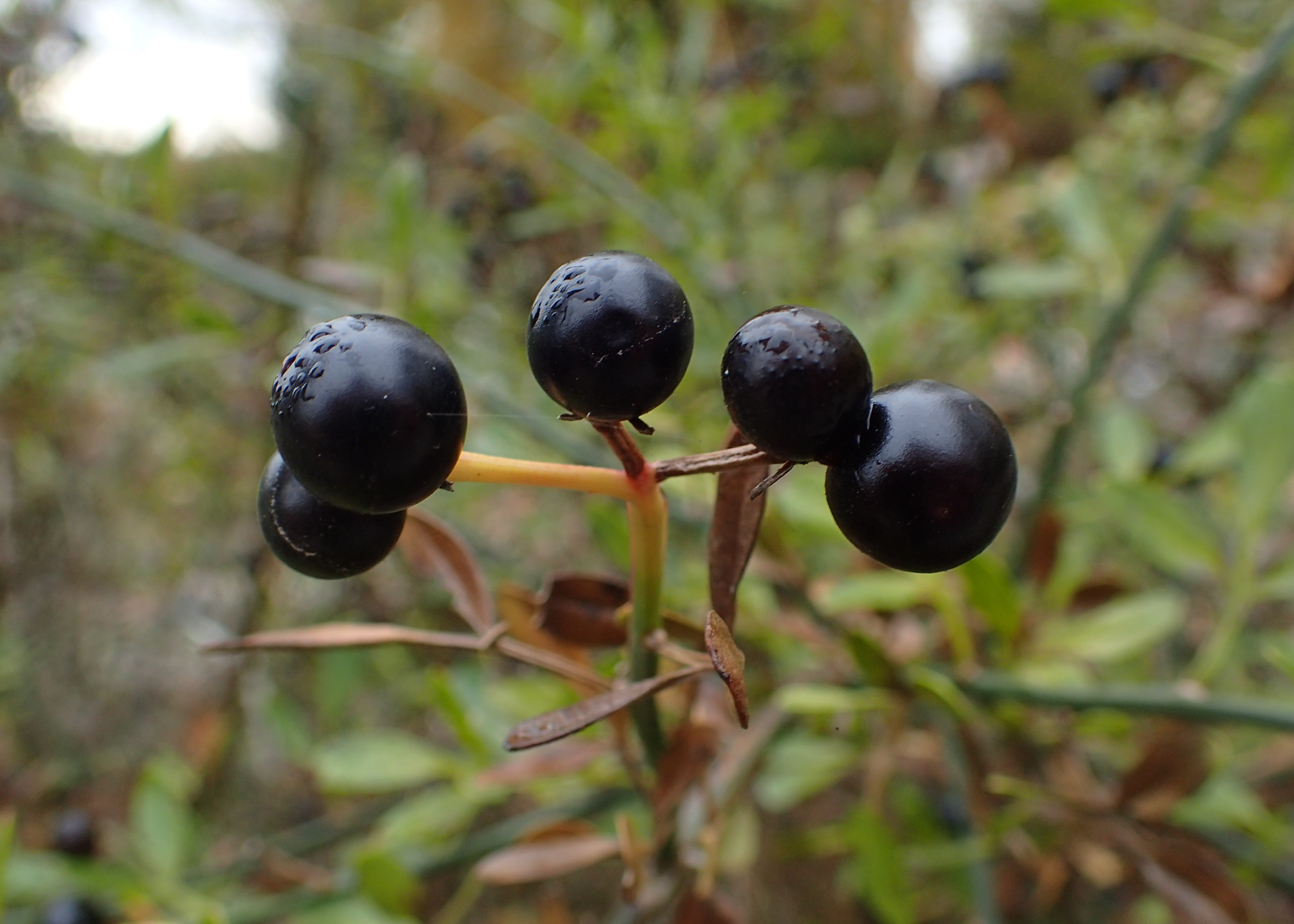
Ripe fruits

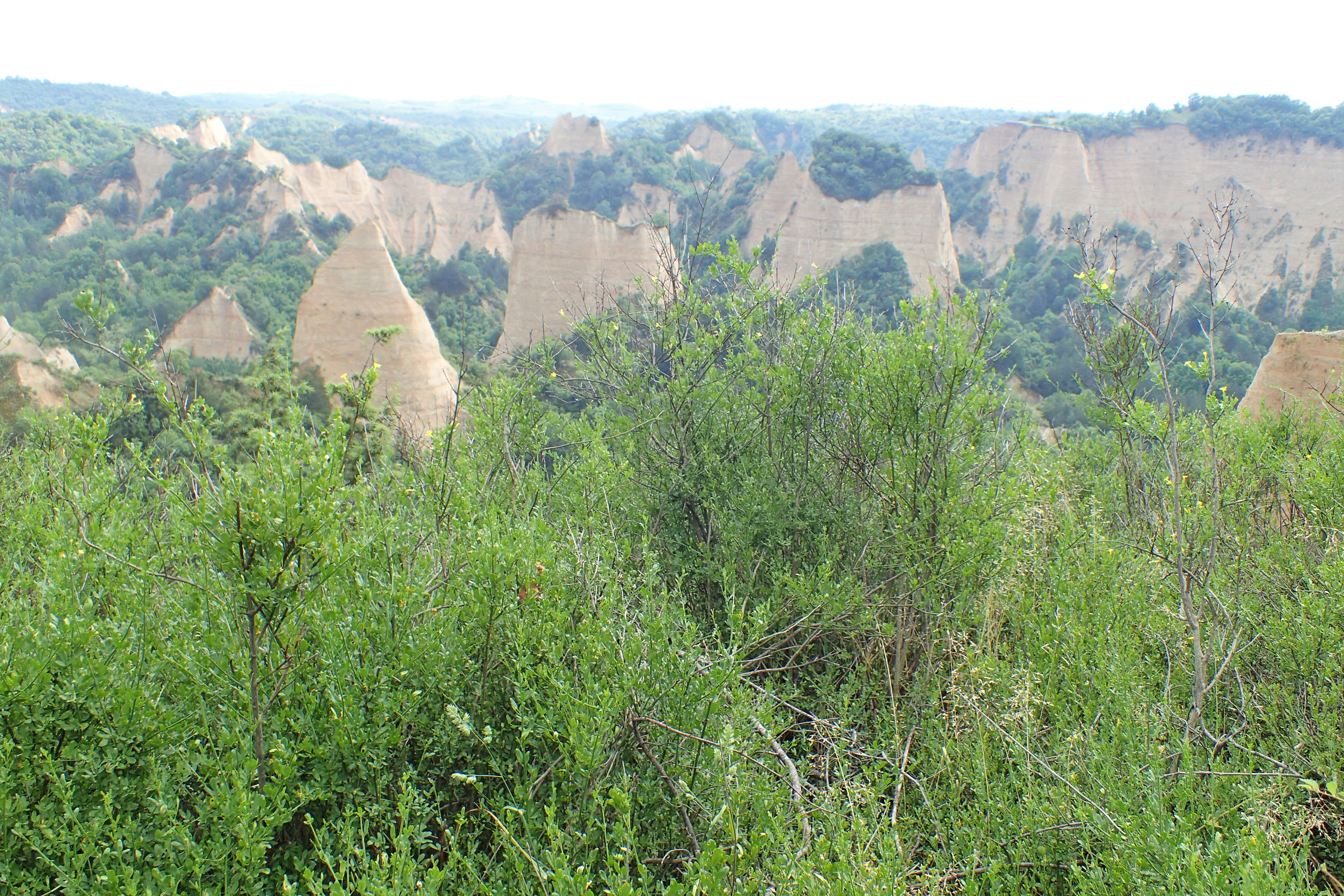
Shrubs of Jasminum fruticans in Melnik, SW Bulgaria
