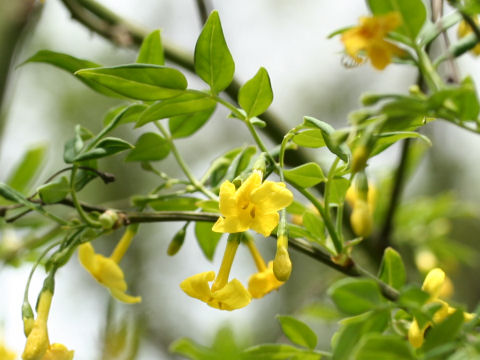

Scientific classification
- Kingdom: Plantae
- Clade: Tracheophytes
- Clade: Angiosperms
- Clade: Eudicots
- Clade: Asterids
- Order: Lamiales
- Family: Oleaceae
- Genus: Chrysojasminum
- Species: C. humile

Binomial name
- Chrysojasminum humile L. Banfi

= Chrysojasminum humile =

Species of plant

Chrysojasminum humile (syn. Jasminum humile), the Italian jasmine or yellow jasmine, is a species of flowering plant in the family Oleaceae, native to Afghanistan, Tajikistan, Pakistan, Nepal, Burma (Myanmar), the Himalayas and south west China (Gansu, Guizhou, Sichuan, Xizang (Tibet), Yunnan). The species is widely cultivated and reportedly naturalized in Greece, Sicily and the former Yugoslavia.

Growing 2.5–4 m (8–13 ft) tall by 3 m (10 ft) wide, it is a roundish semi-evergreen shrub with thick stems. It has stout, dark green leaves, 5 cm long, with 5–7 imparipinnate leaflets. In protected areas it retains its leaves over winter, though in cold winters its foliage and buds may freeze. It blooms in spring and summer with clusters of usually six yellow, scented flowers.

Numerous cultivars have been developed for garden use, of which 'Revolutum' (syn. J. reevesii hort.) has gained the Royal Horticultural Society's Award of Garden Merit.

== Etymology ==
Jasminum is a Latinized version of the Persian name yasemin, or Arabic name, yasamin, which refers to scented plants.

The Latin specific epithet humile means "low-growing".
