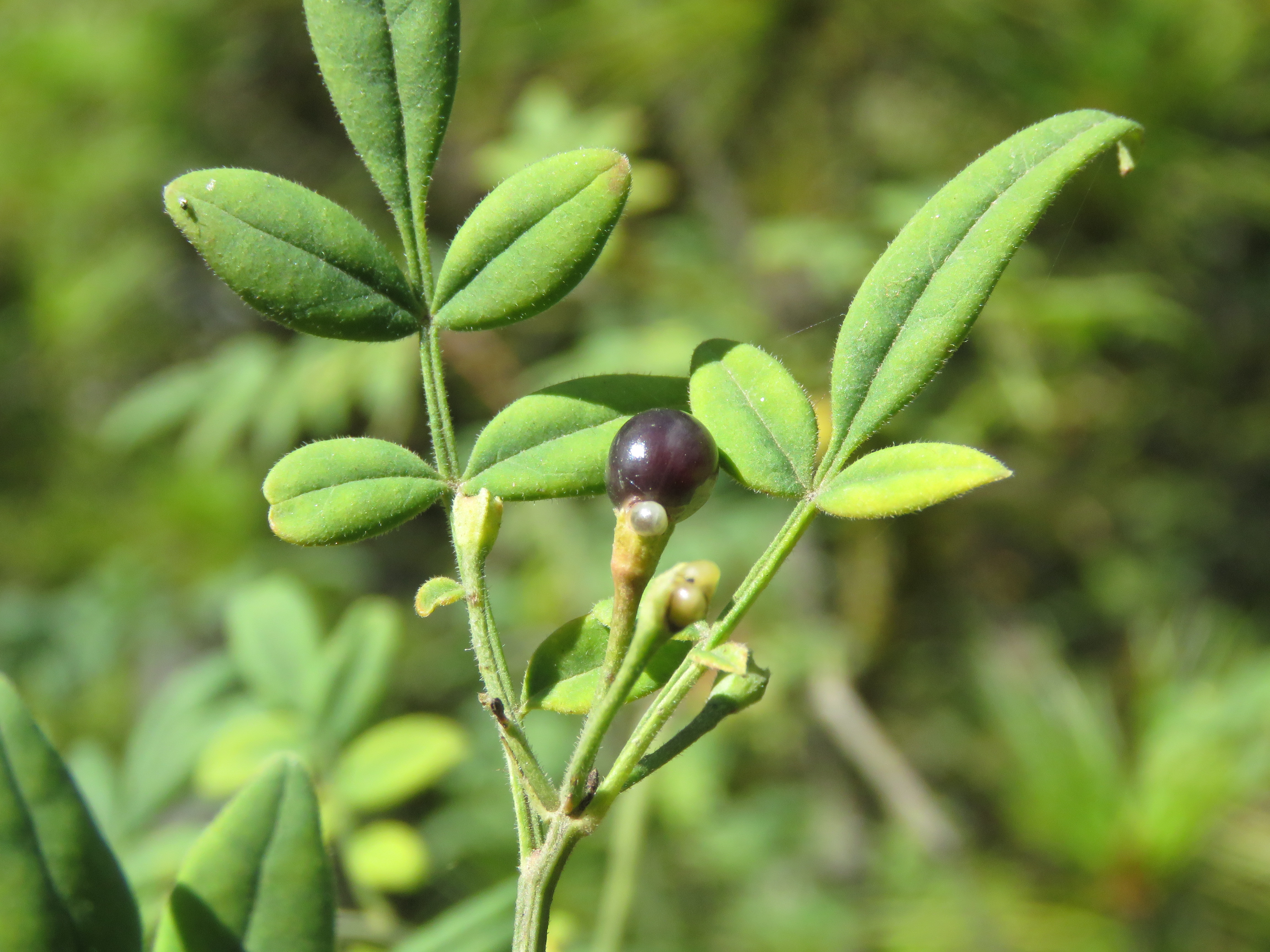
- Chrysojasminum humile

Scientific classification
- Kingdom: Plantae
- Clade: Tracheophytes
- Clade: Angiosperms
- Clade: Eudicots
- Clade: Asterids
- Order: Lamiales
- Family: Oleaceae
- Genus: Chrysojasminum; Banfi

= Chrysojasminum =

Genus of flowering plants

Chrysojasminum is a genus of flowering plants belonging to the family Oleaceae. It is characterized by having alternate leaves and yellow flowers, as opposed to plants of the genus jasminum.

Its native range is Macaronesia, Mediterranean to central China and Sri Lanka, Ethiopia to Zambia.

Species:

- Chrysojasminum bignoniaceum (Wall. ex G.Don) Banfi
- Chrysojasminum floridum (Bunge) Banfi
- Chrysojasminum fruticans (L.) Banfi
- Chrysojasminum goetzeanum (Gilg) Banfi
- Chrysojasminum humile (L.) Banfi
- Chrysojasminum leptophyllum (Rafiq) Banfi
- Chrysojasminum odoratissimum (L.) Banfi
- Chrysojasminum parkeri (Dunn) Banfi
- Chrysojasminum stans (Pax) Banfi
- Chrysojasminum subhumile (W.W.Sm.) Banfi & Galasso
