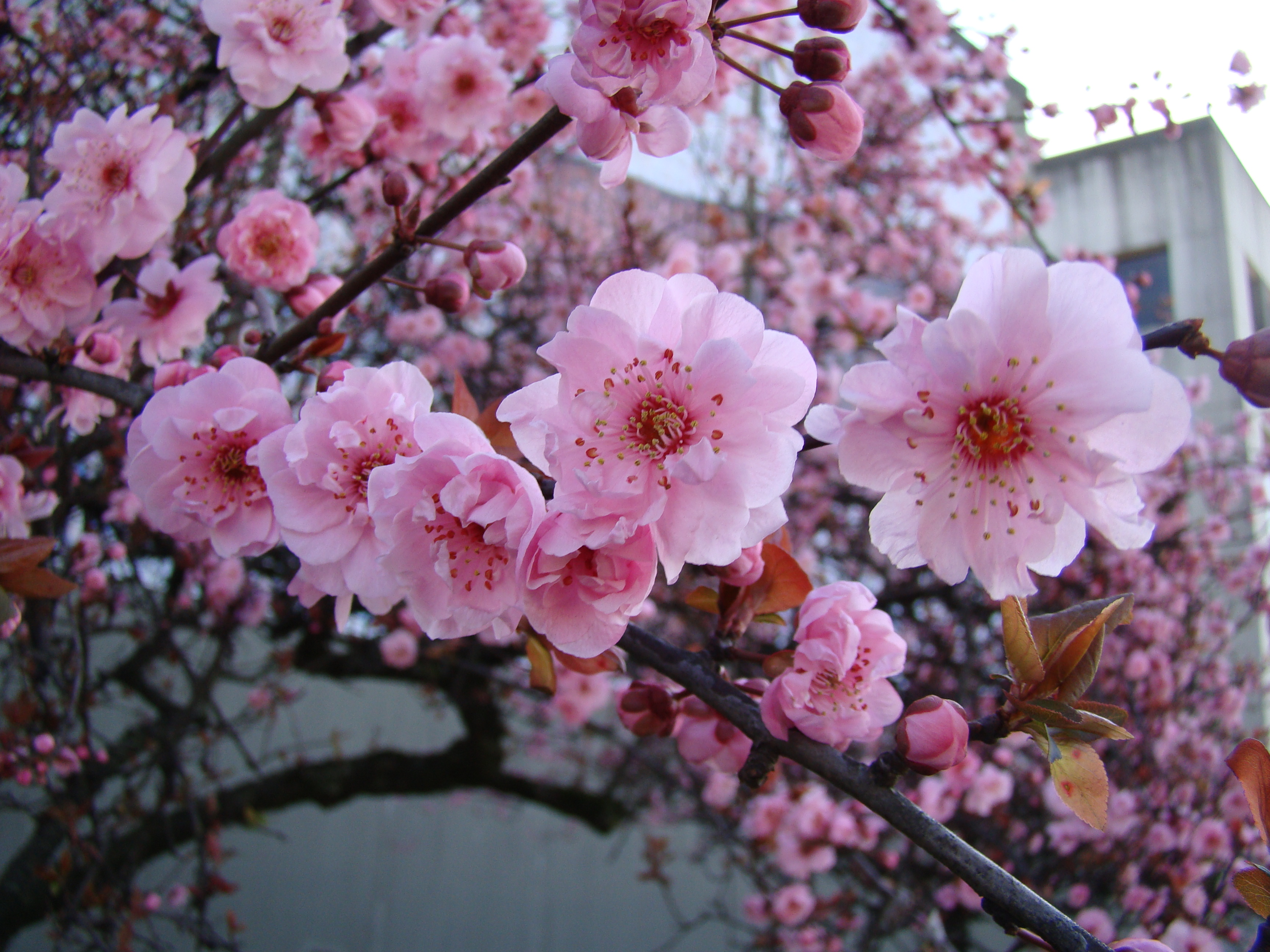

Scientific classification
- Kingdom: Plantae
- Clade: Tracheophytes
- Clade: Angiosperms
- Clade: Eudicots
- Clade: Rosids
- Order: Rosales
- Family: Rosaceae
- Genus: Prunus
- Species: P. × blireiana

Binomial name
- Prunus × blireiana André

= Prunus × blireiana =

Species of flowering plant

Prunus × blireiana (or blireana), the purple-leafed plum or double-flowering plum, is an ornamental flowering plant hybrid in the genus Prunus. It is a cross between the Chinese flowering plum (Prunus mume) and the purple-leaved plum cultivar Prunus cerasifera 'Pissardii'.

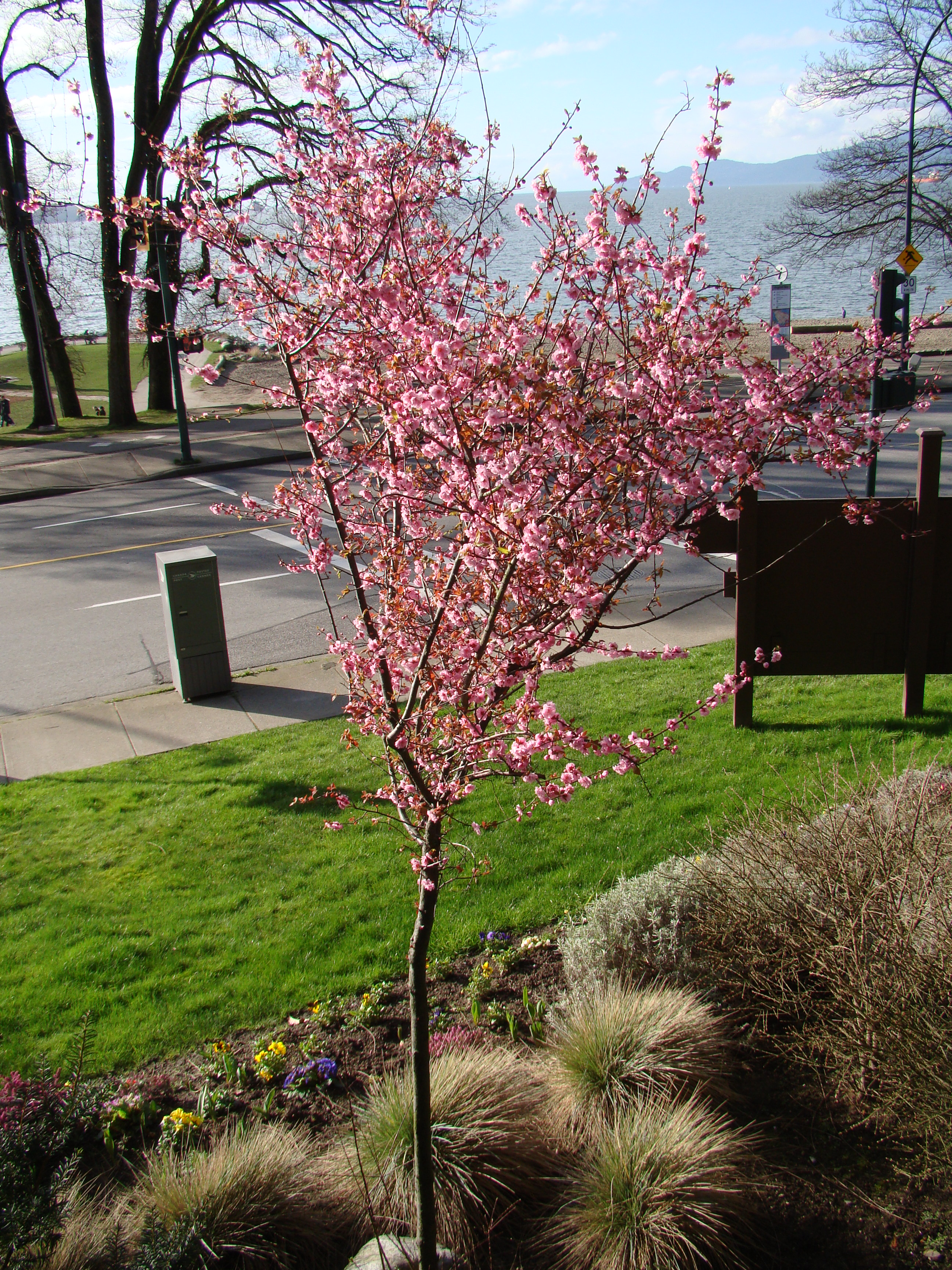

Growing to 4 m (13 ft) tall and broad, it is a hardy deciduous medium-sized shrub or small tree, with rich pink, slightly scented, double blooms in Spring. The blossom is followed by reddish-purple tinged leaves which turn green as the season progresses.

== Etymology ==
The plant was named for the town of Bléré, near Tours, France, and raised by the Lemoine nursery c. 1905.

=== Homotypic synonyms ===
Prunus cerasifera var. blireana (André) Bean in Trees & Shrubs Brit. Isles 2: 232 (1914) Prunus pissardii blireana (André) Lemoine in Nursery Cat. (Lemoine) 164: 14 (1906)

=== Heterotypic synonyms ===
Prunus × blireana f. flore-pleno André in Rev. Hort. (Paris) 77: 392 (1905), not validly publ. Prunus × blireiana f. moseri (Rehder) Koehne in Mitt. Deutsch. Dendrol. Ges. 26: 71 (1917 publ. 1918) Prunus cerasifera var. moseri Rehder in Möller's Deutsche Gärtn.-Zeitung 20: 405 (1905)
