= List of Jasminum species =

As of April 2026, Plants of the World Online accepts the following 202 species and one hybrid:

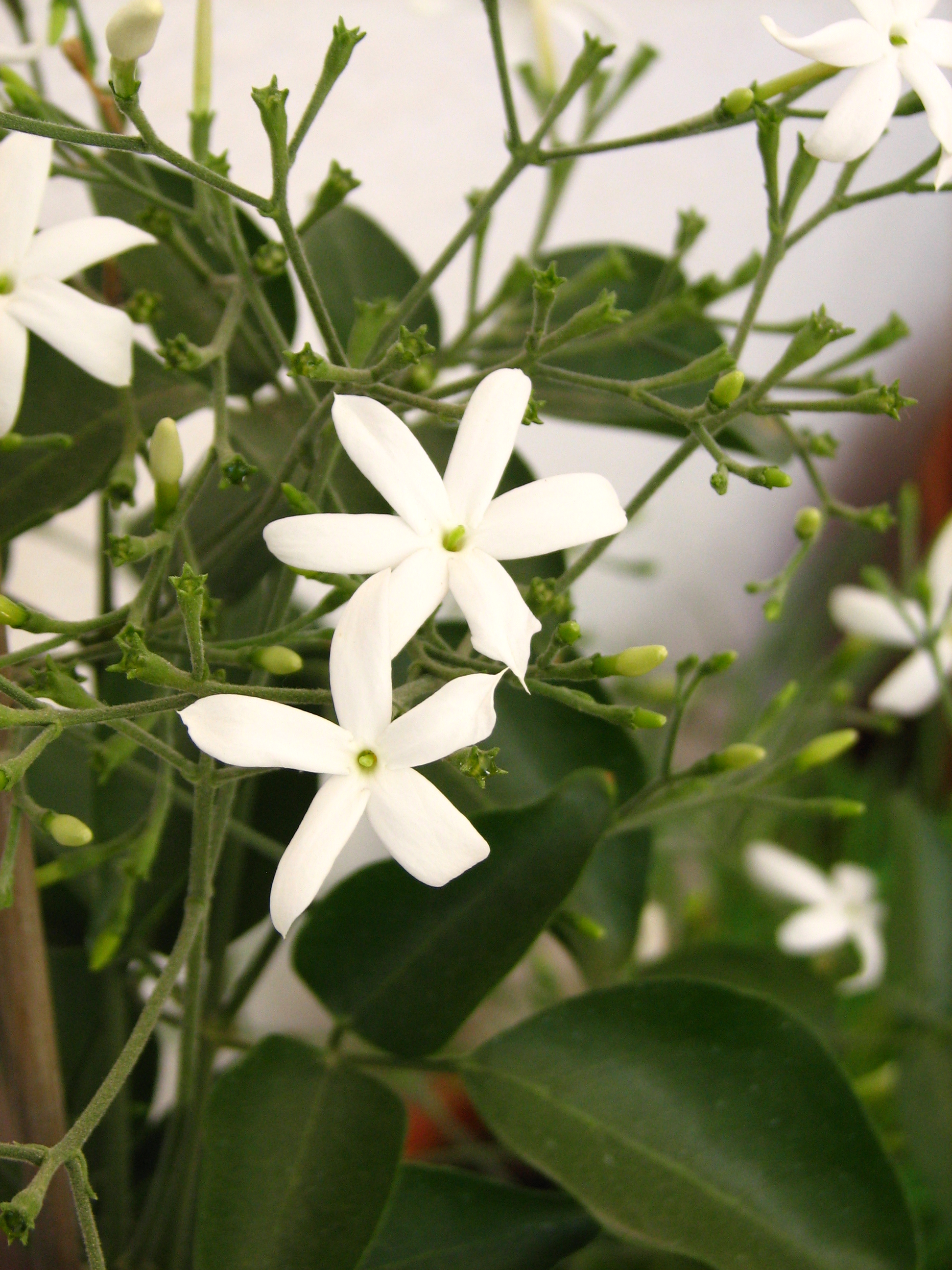
Jasminum azoricum

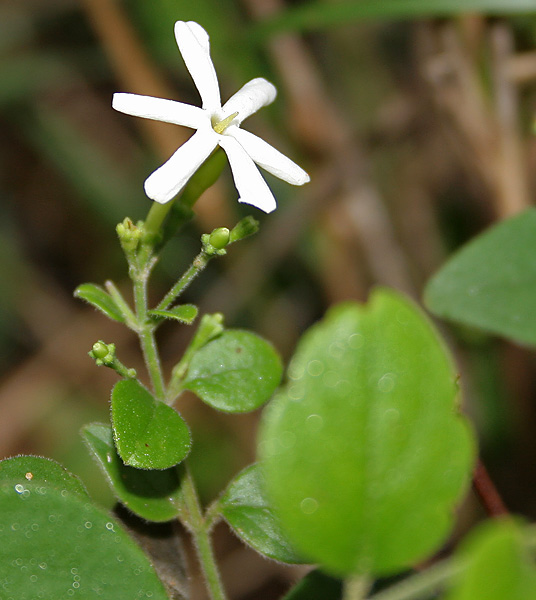
Jasminum auriculatum

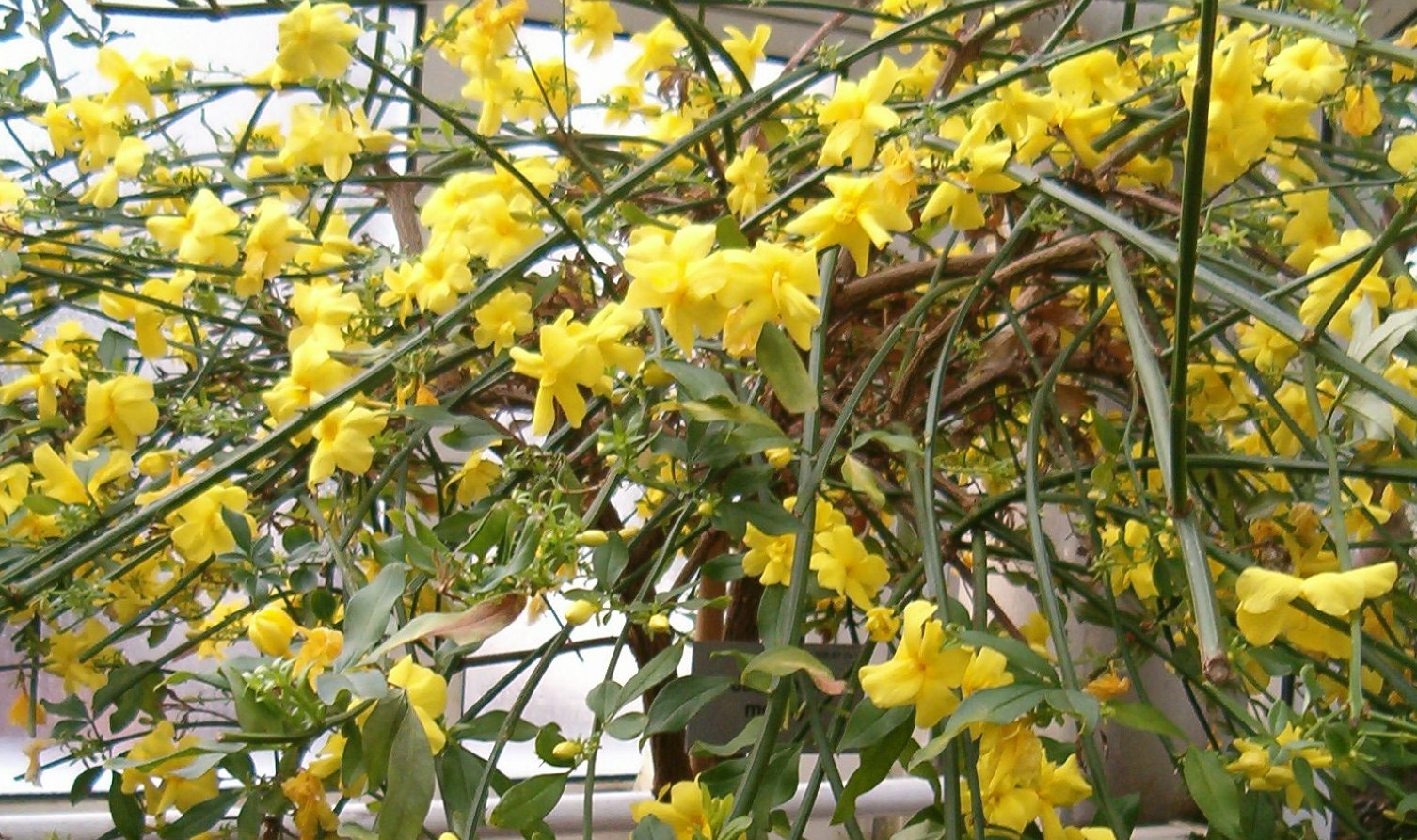
Jasminum mesnyi (cultivated semidouble form)

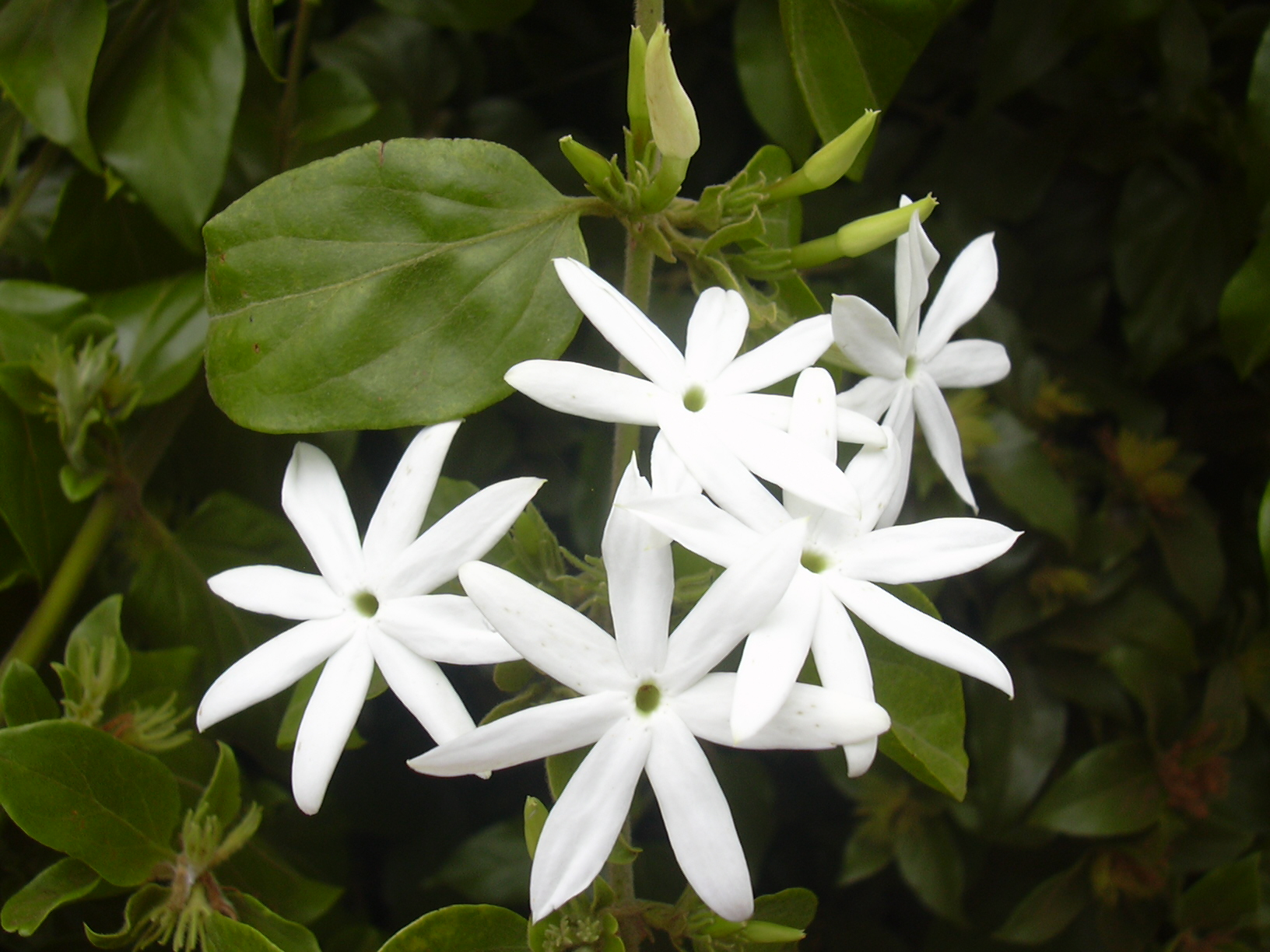
Jasminum multiflorum

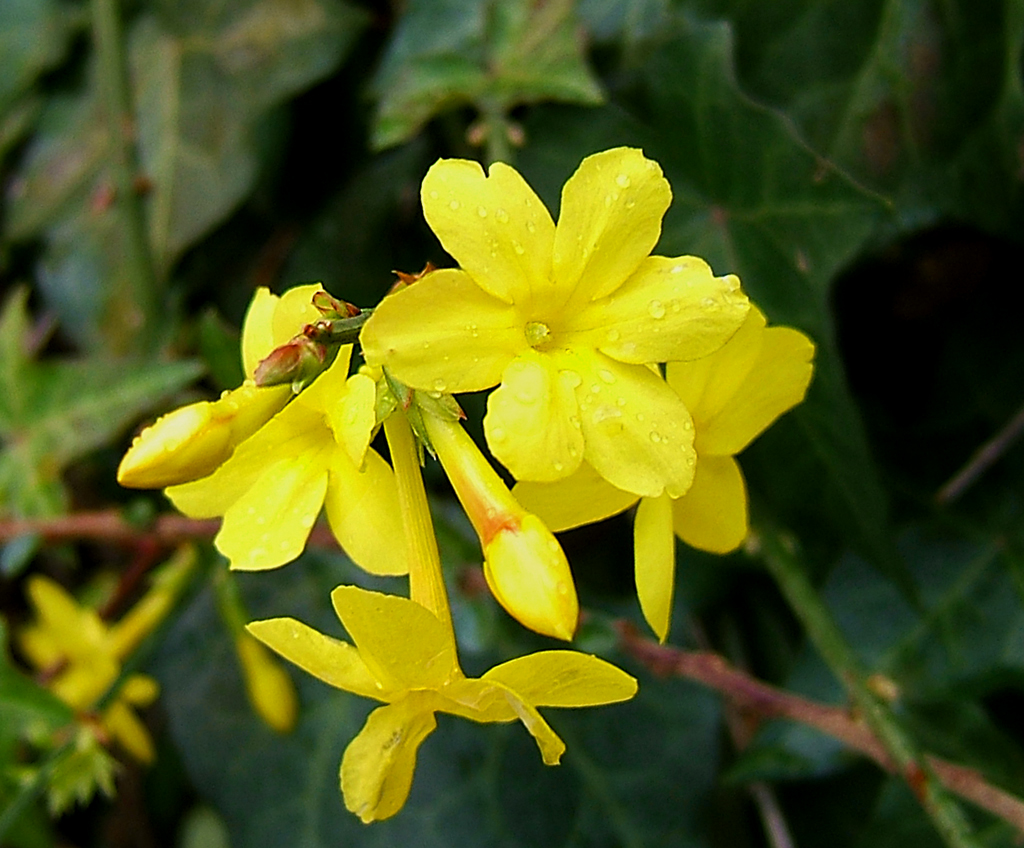
Jasminum nudiflorum

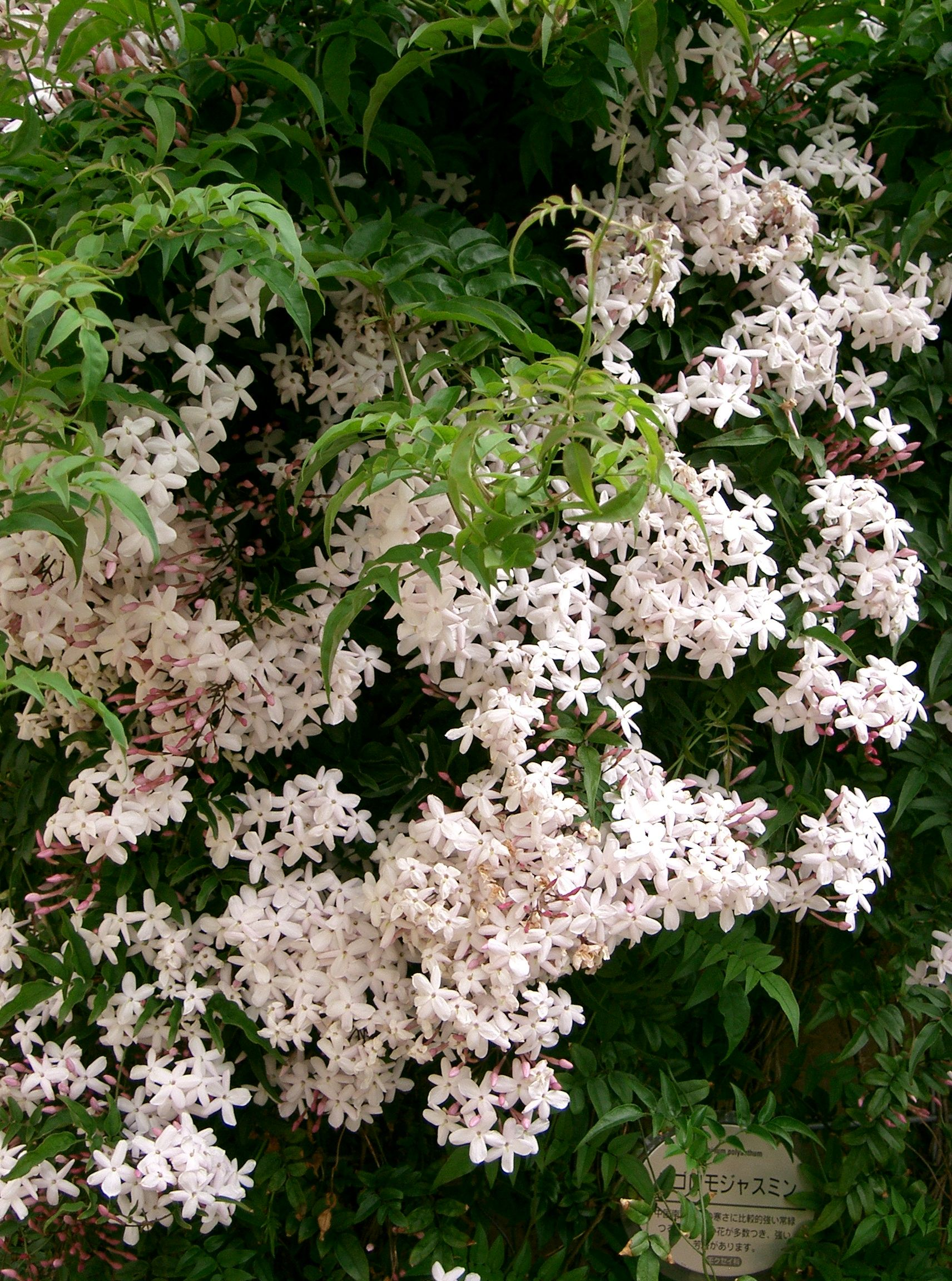
Jasminum polyanthum

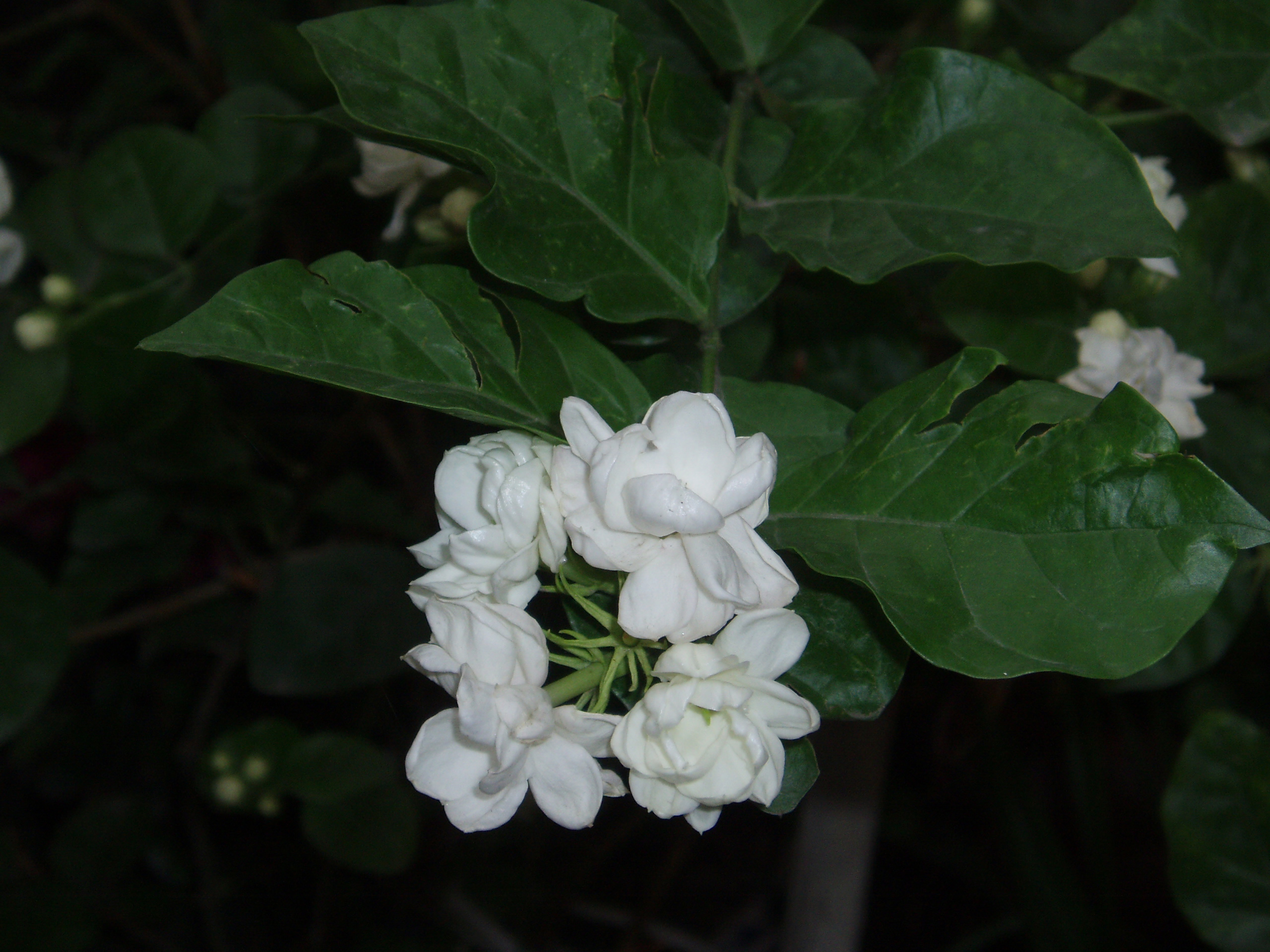
Jasminum sambac

- Jasminum abyssinicum Hochst. ex DC.
- Jasminum acuminatum (Lam.) Pers.
- Jasminum adenophyllum Wall. ex C.B.Clarke
- Jasminum agastyamalayanum Sabeena, Asmitha, Mulani, E.S.S.Kumar & Sibin
- Jasminum alongense Gagnep.
- Jasminum amabile H.Hara
- Jasminum ambiguum Blume
- Jasminum amoenum Blume
- Jasminum andamanicum N.P.Balakr. & N.G.Nair
- Jasminum angolense Baker
- Jasminum angulare Vahl
- Jasminum angustifolium (L.) Willd.
- Jasminum annamense Wernham
- Jasminum anodontum Gagnep.
- Jasminum aphanodon Baker
- Jasminum apoense Elmer
- Jasminum arborescens Roxb.
- Jasminum artense Montrouz.
- Jasminum attenuatum Roxb. ex G.Don
- Jasminum auriculatum Vahl
- Jasminum azoricum L.
- Jasminum bakeri Scott Elliot
- Jasminum batanensis Kiew
- Jasminum beesianum Forrest & Diels
- Jasminum betchei F.Muell.
- Jasminum bhumibolianum Chalermglin
- Jasminum binhchauense B.H.Quang
- Jasminum brachyscyphum Baker
- Jasminum breviflorum Harv.
- Jasminum brevilobum DC.
- Jasminum brevipetiolatum Duthie
- Jasminum calcareum F.Muell.
- Jasminum calcicola Kerr
- Jasminum calophyllum Wall. ex G.Don
- Jasminum campyloneurum Gilg & G.Schellenb.
- Jasminum cardiomorphum P.S.Green
- Jasminum carinatum Blume
- Jasminum carissoides Kerr
- Jasminum caudatum Wall. ex Lindl.
- Jasminum celebicum Merr.
- Jasminum chiae Kai Zhang & D.X.Zhang
- Jasminum cinnamomifolium Kobuski
- Jasminum coarctatum Roxb.
- Jasminum coffeinum Hand.-Mazz.
- Jasminum cordatum Ridl.
- Jasminum cordifolium Wall. ex G.Don
- Jasminum craibianum Kerr
- Jasminum crassifolium Blume
- Jasminum cumingii Merr.
- Jasminum curtisii King & Gamble
- Jasminum cuspidatum Rottler
- Jasminum dallachyi F.Muell.
- Jasminum dasyphyllum Gilg & G.Schellenb.
- Jasminum decipiens P.S.Green
- Jasminum decussatum Wall. ex G.Don
- Jasminum degeneri Kobuski
- Jasminum dichotomum Vahl
- Jasminum didymum G.Forst.
- Jasminum dinklagei Gilg & G.Schellenb.
- Jasminum dispermum Wall.
- Jasminum dolichopetalum Merr. & Rolfe
- Jasminum domatiigerum Lingelsh.
- Jasminum duclouxii (H.Lév.) Rehder
- Jasminum eberhardtii Gagnep.
- Jasminum elatum Pancher ex Guillaumin
- Jasminum elegans Knobl.
- Jasminum elongatum (P.J.Bergius) Willd.
- Jasminum extensum Wall. ex G.Don
- Jasminum flavovirens Gilg & G.Schellenb.
- Jasminum flexile Vahl
- Jasminum fluminense Vell.
- Jasminum foveatum R.H.Miao
- Jasminum fuchsiifolium Gagnep.
- Jasminum gilgianum K.Schum.
- Jasminum glaucum (L.f.) Aiton
- Jasminum grandiflorum L.
- Jasminum greenii Soosairaj & P.Raja
- Jasminum greveanum Danguy ex H.Perrier
- Jasminum griffithii C.B.Clarke
- Jasminum guangxiense B.M.Miao
- Jasminum harmandianum Gagnep.
- Jasminum hasseltianum Blume
- Jasminum honghoense K.Zhang & D.X.Zhang
- Jasminum hongshuihoense Z.P.Jien ex B.M.Miao
- Jasminum insigne Blume
- Jasminum insularum Kerr
- Jasminum ixoroides Elmer
- Jasminum jenniae W.K.Harris & G.Holmes
- Jasminum kajewskii C.T.White
- Jasminum kaulbackii P.S.Green
- Jasminum kedahense (King & Gamble) Ridl.
- Jasminum kerstingii Gilg & G.Schellenb.
- Jasminum kitchingii Baker
- Jasminum kontumense B.H.Quang
- Jasminum kostermansii Kiew
- Jasminum kriegeri Guillaumin
- Jasminum kwangense Liben
- Jasminum lanceolaria Roxb.
- Jasminum lasiosepalum Gilg & G.Schellenb.
- Jasminum latipetalum C.B.Clarke
- Jasminum laurifolium Roxb. ex Hornem.
- Jasminum laxiflorum Gagnep.
- Jasminum ledangense Kiew
- Jasminum listeri King ex Gage
- Jasminum longipetalum King & Gamble
- Jasminum longitubum L.C.Chia ex B.M.Miao
- Jasminum mackeeorum P.S.Green
- Jasminum macrocarpum Merr.
- Jasminum magnificum Lingelsh.
- Jasminum maingayi C.B.Clarke
- Jasminum malabaricum Wight
- Jasminum marianum DC.
- Jasminum melastomifolium Ridl.
- Jasminum mesnyi Hance
- Jasminum meyeri-johannis Engl.
- Jasminum microcalyx Hance
- Jasminum molle R.Br.
- Jasminum mossamedense Hiern
- Jasminum mouilaense Breteler
- Jasminum multiflorum (Burm.f.) Andrews
- Jasminum multinervosum Kiew
- Jasminum multipartitum Hochst.
- Jasminum multipetalum Merr.
- Jasminum narcissiodorum Gilg & G.Schellenb.
- Jasminum nardydorum Breteler
- Jasminum neocaledonicum Schltr.
- Jasminum nepalense Spreng.
- Jasminum nervosum Lour.
- Jasminum newtonii Gilg & G.Schellenb.
- Jasminum niloticum Gilg
- Jasminum nintooides Rehder
- Jasminum nobile C.B.Clarke
- Jasminum noldeanum Knobl.
- Jasminum noumeense Schltr.
- Jasminum nudiflorum Lindl.
- Jasminum nummulariifolium Baker
- Jasminum obtusifolium Baker
- Jasminum octocuspe Baker
- Jasminum officinale L.
- Jasminum oliganthum Quisumb. & Merr.
- Jasminum oreophilum Kiew
- Jasminum papuasicum Lingelsh.
- Jasminum parceflorum Kai Zhang & D.X.Zhang
- Jasminum pauciflorum Benth.
- Jasminum paucinervium Ridl.
- Jasminum pedunculatum Gagnep.
- Jasminum pellucidum Airy Shaw
- Jasminum peninsulare Kiew
- Jasminum pentaneurum Hand.-Mazz.
- Jasminum pericallianthum Kobuski
- Jasminum perissanthum P.S.Green
- Jasminum pierreanum Gagnep.
- Jasminum pipolyi W.N.Takeuchi
- Jasminum polyanthum Franch.
- Jasminum populifolium Blume
- Jasminum prainii H.Lév.
- Jasminum preussii Engl. & Knobl.
- Jasminum promunturianum Däniker
- Jasminum pseudopinnatum Merr. & Rolfe
- Jasminum pteropodum H.Perrier
- Jasminum puberulum Baker
- Jasminum punctulatum Chiov.
- Jasminum quinatum Schinz
- Jasminum rambayense Kuntze
- Jasminum ranongense Kiew
- Jasminum rehderianum Kobuski
- Jasminum ritchiei C.B.Clarke
- Jasminum rufohirtum Gagnep.
- Jasminum rupestre Blume
- Jasminum sambac (L.) Aiton
- Jasminum sarawacense King & Gamble
- Jasminum scandens (Retz.) Vahl
- Jasminum schimperi Vatke
- Jasminum sessile A.C.Sm.
- Jasminum shahii Kiew
- Jasminum siamense Craib
- Jasminum simplicifolium G.Forst.
- Jasminum sinense Hemsl.
- Jasminum smilacifolium Griff. ex C.B.Clarke
- Jasminum spectabile Ridl.
- Jasminum steenisii Kiew
- Jasminum stellipilum Kerr
- Jasminum stenolobum Rolfe
- Jasminum × stephanense É.Lemoine
- Jasminum streptopus E.Mey.
- Jasminum subglandulosum Kurz
- Jasminum syringifolium Wall. ex G.Don
- Jasminum tetraquetrum A.Gray
- Jasminum thomense Exell
- Jasminum tomentosum Knobl.
- Jasminum tortuosum Willd.
- Jasminum trichotomum B.Heyne ex Roth
- Jasminum tubiflorum Roxb.
- Jasminum turneri C.T.White
- Jasminum urophyllum Hemsl.
- Jasminum verdickii De Wild.
- Jasminum vidalii P.S.Green
- Jasminum vietnamense B.H.Quang & Joongku Lee
- Jasminum waitzianum Blume
- Jasminum wengeri C.E.C.Fisch.
- Jasminum wrayi King & Gamble
- Jasminum yuanjiangense P.Y.Pai
- Jasminum zippelianum Blume
