= Park of Nurseries of Ulia =

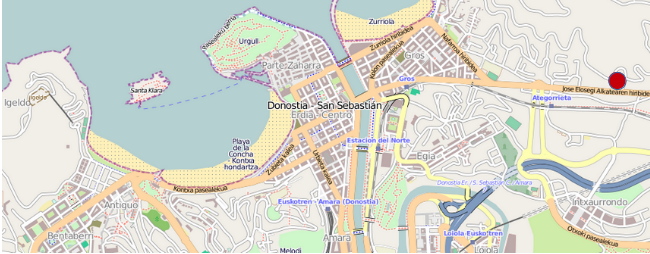
- Location within the city of San Sebastián
- Type: Public park
- Location: Ulia in San Sebastián, Basque Country, Spain
- Coordinates: 43°19′20″N 1°57′11″W
- Area: 14,500 m^{2} (3.6 acres)
- Created: 1894
- Operator: city council
- Status: Open year round
- Website: uliakolorebaratzak.wordpress.com/parkearen-jatorria

The Park of Nurseries of Ulia lies at the neighbourhood of Ulía in San Sebastián, extending over 14,500 m^{2} (3.6 acres) at the start of the Walk of Ulia, in the crossing with Jose Elosegi street. It is also named Lore-Baratzak Park on account of the nurseries held inside, which provided the plants for the public gardens of San Sebastián during all the 20th century and until 2008, when the city council moved these municipal nurseries to Lau Haizeta.

After seven years closed for public, in 2015 the area residents opened it again and managed it with the permission of the city council, conflicting with the city council's own 2016 plan to remove the park for housing development. The park is of great value because it includes two former water tanks going back to the 19th century, as well as architectonic elements, and uncommon flora and fauna.

== The deposits of water ==
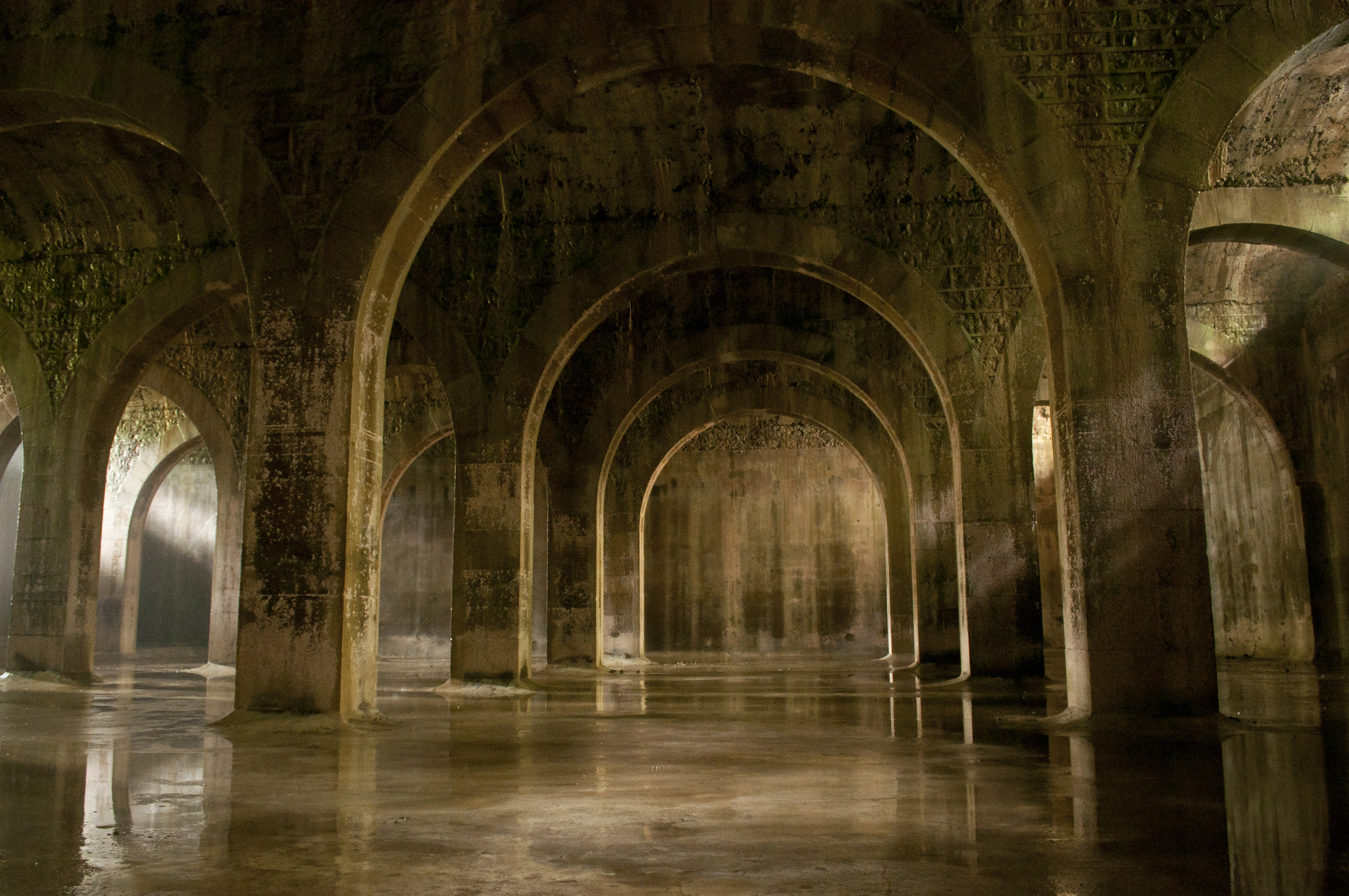
The deposit of water Buskando

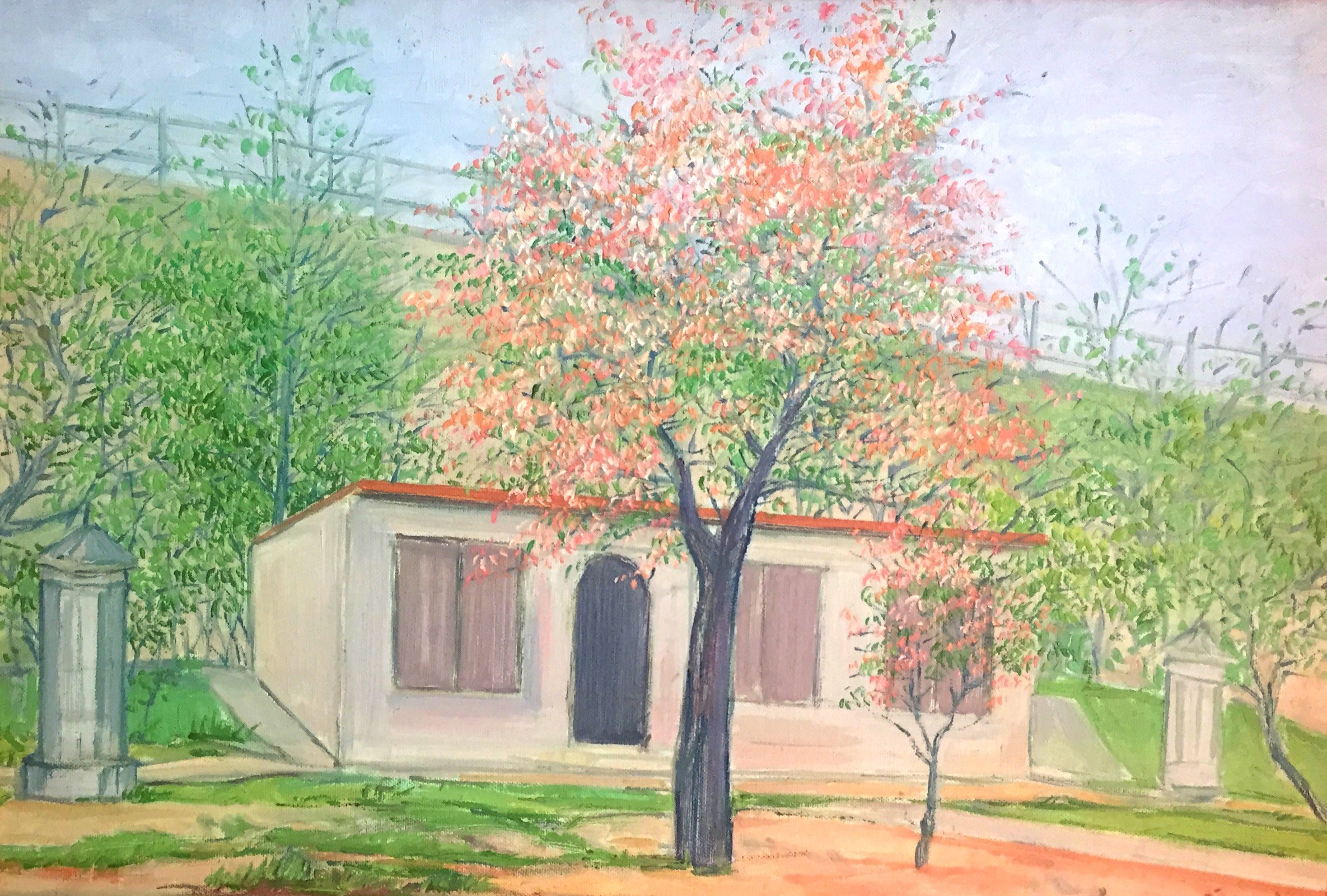
Soroborda, (Tony D. Pájaro, 1996)

Soroborda and Buskando, two ancient and very well conserved deposits of water of the 19th century are situated inside the park. The existence of these deposits was practically unknown in San Sebastián when in 2006 they were to be demolished to build luxury houses, but a report of Aranzadi association put in relief his architectural value and as an important element in the city's cultural heritage.

== Birds and animals ==
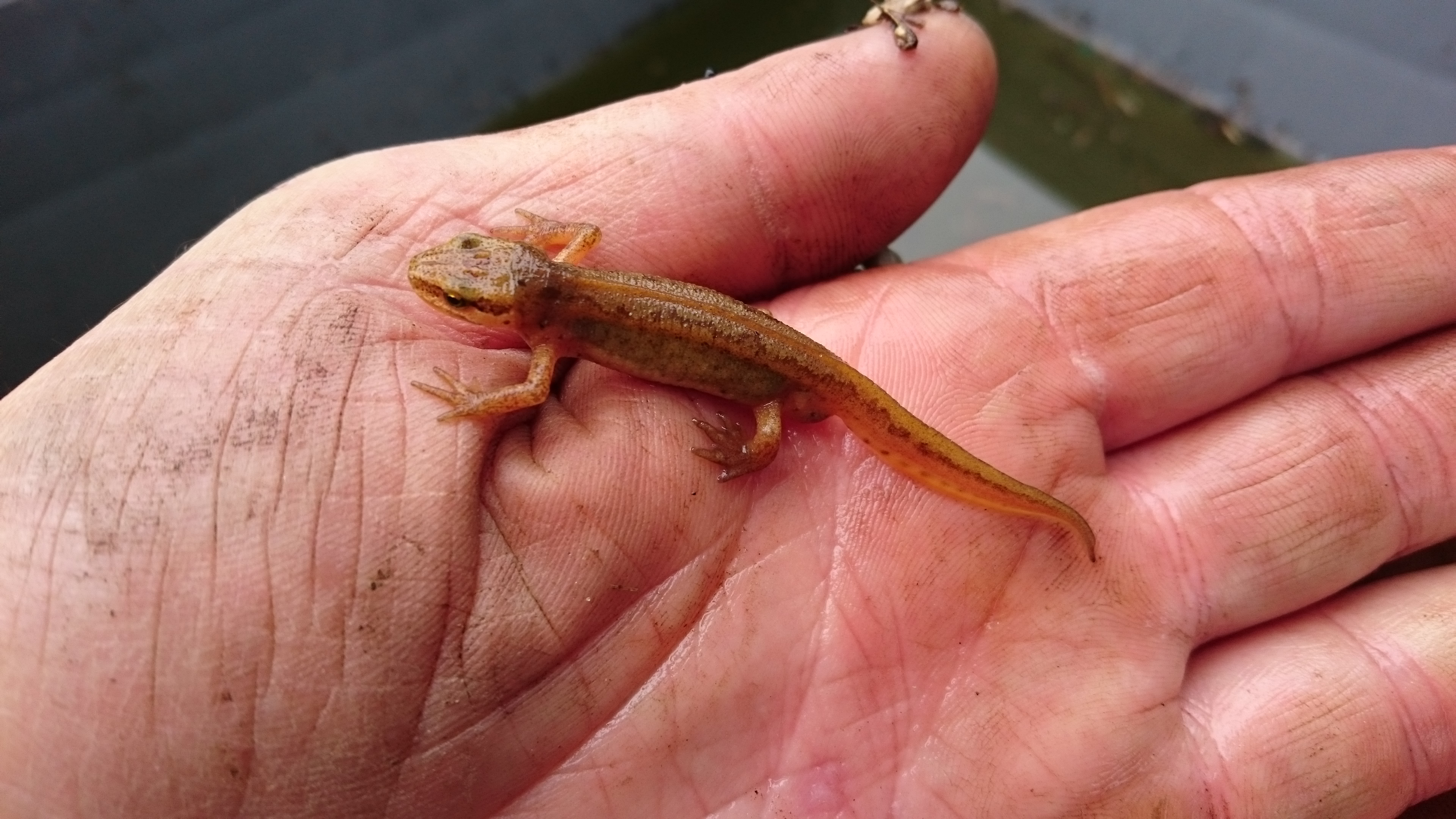
A salamander from the park

Amphibians like the common midwife toad and the salamander live at the puddles in the park.

In its monthly organised sessions in the park by Seo/BirdLife of Donostia the members of this association have observed up to 32 bird species.

== Trees and plants ==
At least they are 39 the species of trees in the park. Most of them are not autochthonous, they came from abroad countries, brought like curiosity by the gardeners commissioned of the Municipal Nurseries.

The cataloged species are the following:

- Ailanthus altissima
- Abutilon megapotamicum02.jpg|Abutilon megapotamicum
- Bamboo (Bambuseae)
- Bougainvillea
- Cordyline (Cordyline australis)
- Laurel (Laurus nobilis)
- Euonymus fortunei
- Boxwood (Buxus sempervirens)
- Fuchsia magellanica
- Cherry plum (Prunus cerasifera var. pissardii)
- Prunus laurocerasus
- Glycine (Wisteria)
- Taxus baccata
- Nerium oleander
- Common hazel (Corylus hazelnut)
- Lagerstroemia indica
- Privet (Ligustrum japonicum)
- Rosa rugosa
- Rosa rugosa
- Japanese maple (Acer palmatum)
- Musa × paradisiaca
- Aralia (Fatsia japonica)
- Prunus serrulata
- Japanese jasmine (Jasminum mesnyi)
- Yucca (Yucca elephantipes)
- Rubber (Ficus elastica)
- Ash (Fraxinus excelsior)
- Magnolia (Magnolia grandiflora)
- Common grape vine (Vitis vinifera)
- Acanthus
- Cyperus alternifolius
- Phlomis
- Phoenix canariensis
- Common fig (Ficus carica)
- Pinus mugo
- Pittosporum tobira
- Platanus orientalis
- Syrian ketmia (Hibiscus syriacus)
- Thuja
- Trachycarpus fortunei
- Cedar (Cedrus)
- Cockspur coral tree (Erythrina crista-galli)
