= Yellow jasmine =

Yellow jasmine or wild yellow jasmine is a common name for several plants and may refer to:

- Gelsemium sempervirens, native to tropical and warm temperate regions of the Americas
- Jasminum humile, native to Asia and naturalized in Europe
- Jasminum mesnyi, native to Vietnam and southern China and naturalized in North America
- Pittosporum revolutum, native to Australia
