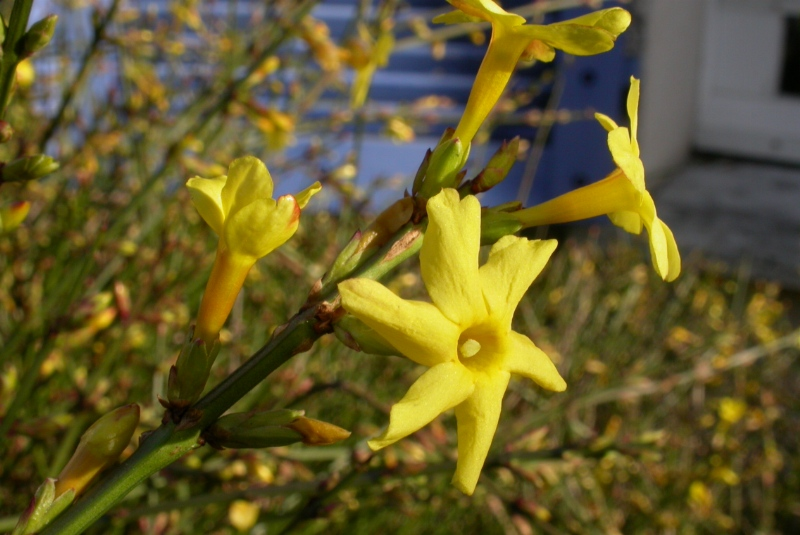

Scientific classification
- Kingdom: Plantae
- Clade: Tracheophytes
- Clade: Angiosperms
- Clade: Eudicots
- Clade: Asterids
- Order: Lamiales
- Family: Oleaceae
- Genus: Jasminum
- Species: J. nudiflorum

Binomial name
- Jasminum nudiflorum Lindl.

Synonyms
- Jasminum angulare Bunge [Illegitimate]; Jasminum nudiflorum var. aureum Dippel; Jasminum nudiflorum f. nudiflorum Unknown; Jasminum nudiflorum var. nudiflorum Unknown; Jasminum nudiflorum var. variegatum Mouill.; Jasminum sieboldianum Blume

= Jasminum nudiflorum =

Winter jasmine

Species of shrub

Jasminum nudiflorum, the winter jasmine, is a slender, deciduous shrub native to China (Gansu, Shaanxi, Sichuan, Xizang (Tibet), Yunnan). The flower's blossoming peaks right after winter, which is why it is also named Yingchun (迎春) in Chinese, which means "the flower that welcomes Spring". It is widely cultivated as an ornamental and is reportedly naturalized in France and in scattered locations in the United States (Texas, Oklahoma, Georgia, Tennessee, Maryland and New Jersey).

== Description ==
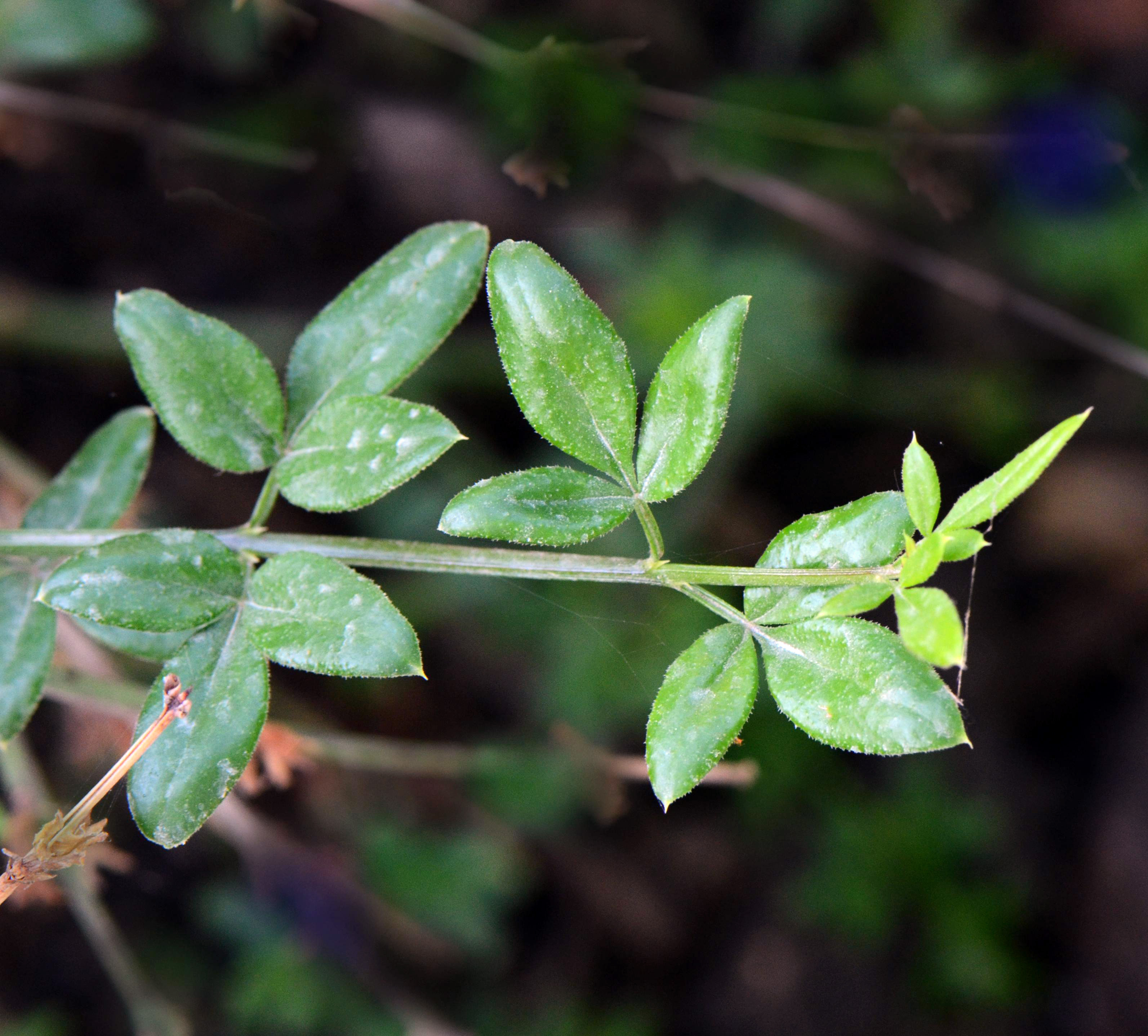
Leaves

It grows to 3 m (10 ft) tall and wide, with arching green shoots and opposite, pinnate, dark green leaves. Each leaf is divided into three oval-oblong leaflets which are about 3 cm long. It is a trailing, vine-like shrub.

As its name suggests, in the Northern Hemisphere winter jasmine flowers from November to March. The solitary flowers, often appearing on the bare stems (hence the Latin nudiflorum, literally "naked flower") have six petals and are bright yellow, or white, about 1 cm across, appearing in the leaf axils.

== Taxonomy ==
It is known as yíng chūn huā (迎春花) in Mandarin Pinyin.

It is also known as 'jasmim-amarelo' in Portuguese (Brazil) and 'vinterjasmin' in Swedish.

It is called Gelsomino d'inverno or Gelsomino di San Giuseppe in Italiano.

It was collected in China by Robert Fortune.

It was first published and described by Lindl. in the Journal of the Horticultural Society of London Vol.1 on page 153 in 1846.

It was verified by United States Department of Agriculture and the Agricultural Research Service on 30 September 2011.

== Distribution and range ==
It is native to China. It is found within many Provinces of China, (including Guangxi, Gansu, Shanxi, Sichuan, Xizang (also referred to as Tibet) and Yunnan.

== Cultivation ==
Jasminum nudiflorum is valued by gardeners as one of the few plants that are in flower during the winter months. It is frequently trained against a wall to provide extra warmth and shelter, but also lends itself to groundcover. It tolerates hard pruning and should be pruned in spring immediately after flowering; regular pruning will help to prevent bare patches. It can also be grown as a bonsai and is very tolerant of the wiring methods. It likes full sun or partial shade and is hardy.

It has gained the Royal Horticultural Society's Award of Garden Merit. It can be propagated using the layering technique.
