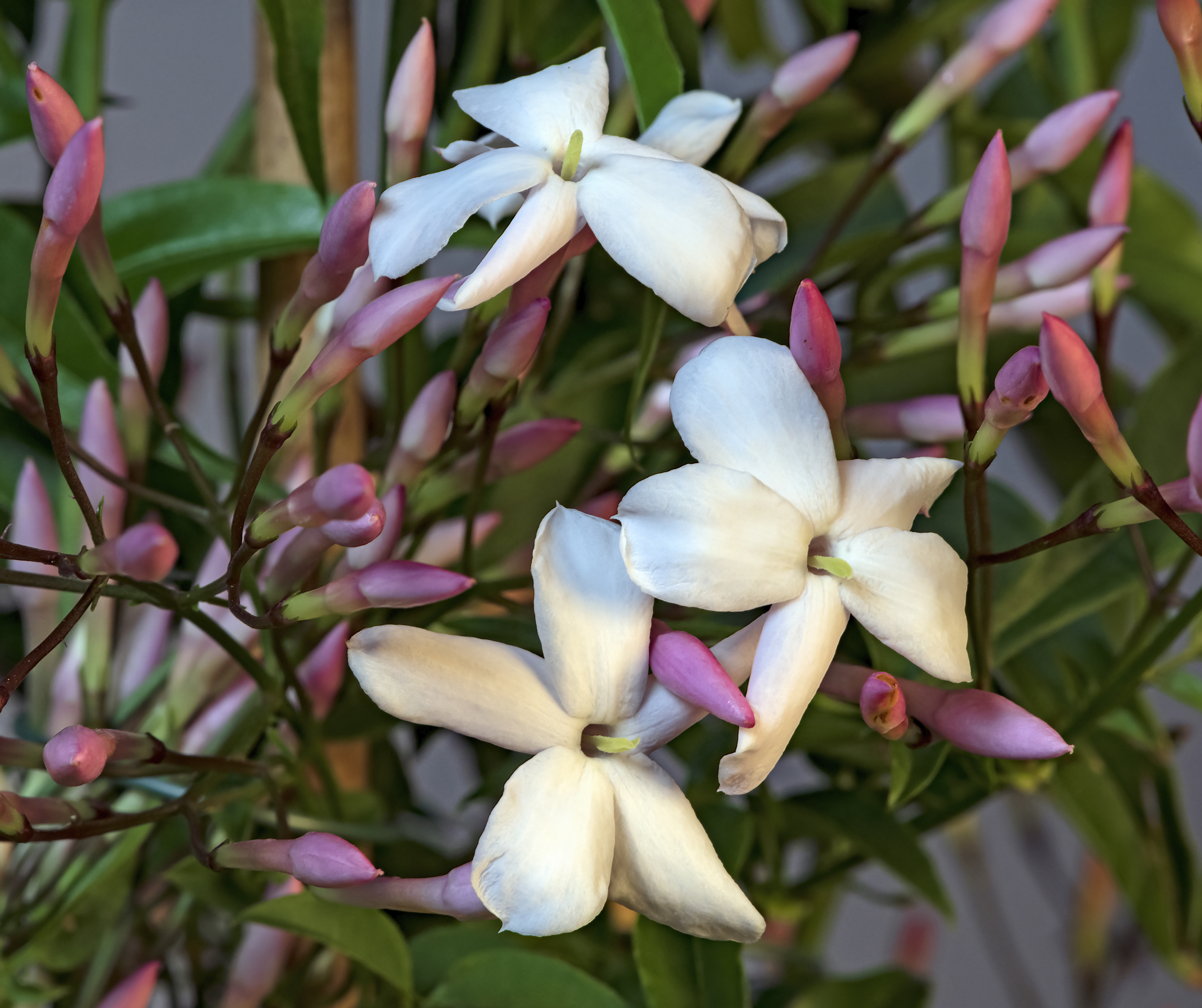

Scientific classification
- Kingdom: Plantae
- Clade: Embryophytes
- Clade: Tracheophytes
- Clade: Spermatophytes
- Clade: Angiosperms
- Clade: Eudicots
- Clade: Asterids
- Order: Lamiales
- Family: Oleaceae
- Genus: Jasminum
- Species: J. polyanthum

Binomial name
- Jasminum polyanthum Franch.

= Jasminum polyanthum =

Species of jasmine

Jasminum polyanthum (Chinese: 多花素馨; pinyin: Duōhuāsùxīn), the many-flowered jasmine, pink jasmine, or white jasmine, is a species of flowering plant in the olive family Oleaceae, native to China and Myanmar. A strong evergreen twining climber, it is especially noted for its abundant, highly fragrant pink to white flowers.

== Name ==
The Latin specific epithet polyanthum means "many-flowered".

== Description ==
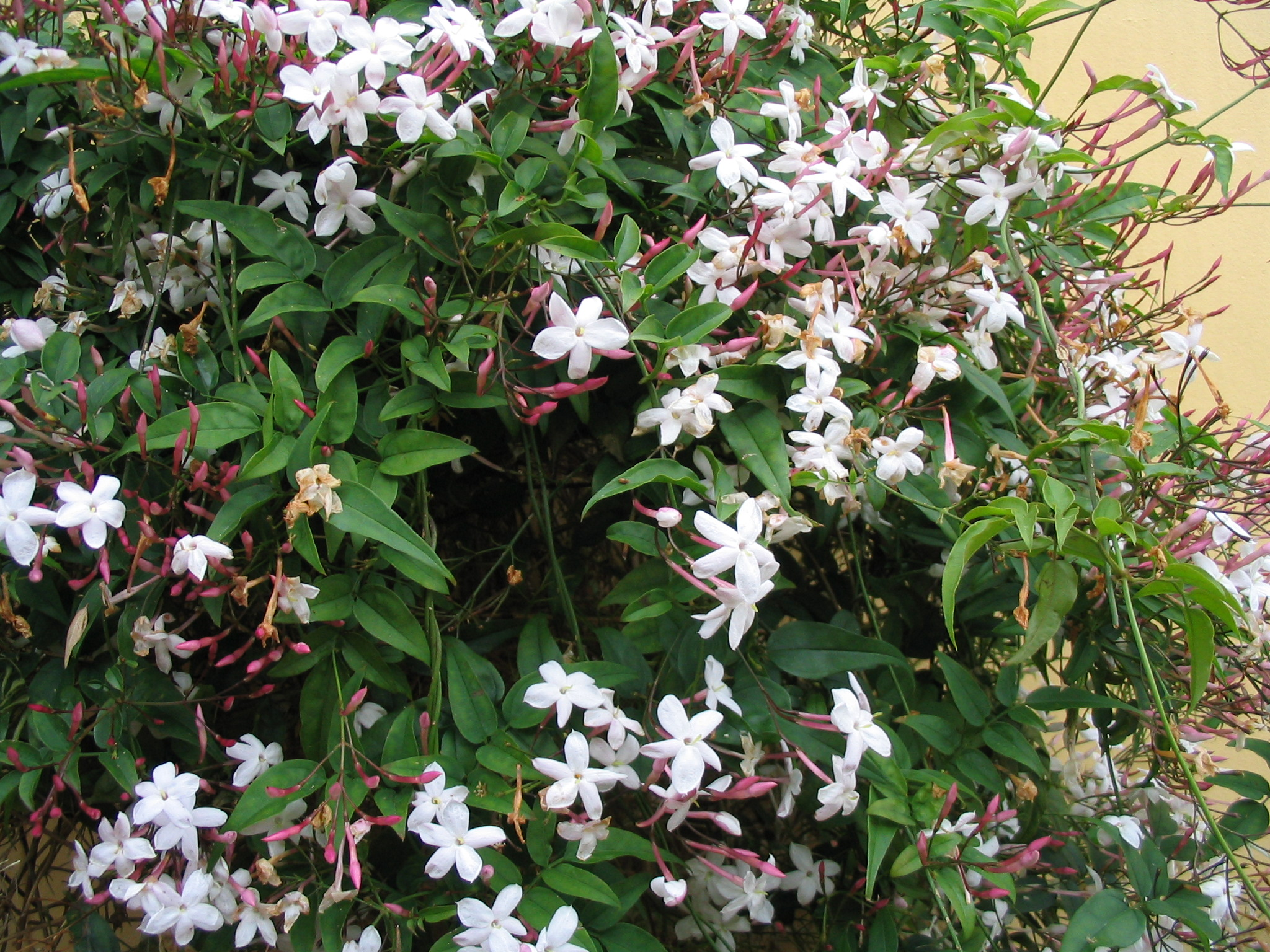

When supported, the plant can grow up to 6 metres (20 feet) in height. The compound leaves with 5 to 9 leaflets are dark green on the upper surface and a lighter green beneath, with glabrous, terete or angular branches. The terminal leaflet is noticeably larger than the other leaflets.

=== Inflorescence ===
The species is heterostylous, meaning that a few distinct flower morphs (forms) are available, though each plant bears only one morph. In late winter and early spring it produces an abundance of reddish-pink flower buds, followed by fragrant five-petalled starry white flowers which are about 2 cm (3/4 inch) in diameter. The bracts are subulate (tapering to a point), 1-6 mm. Each flower is carried by a pedicel (single stalk) of 0.5 - 2.5cm (1/5 - 1 inch) The calyx forms a 1-2 mm tube terminating in 5 triangular or subulate-linear lobes, only 2 mm long, and a corolla, white, with a red underside and red buttons. The fruit is a black, globular berry.

== Distribution and habitat ==
The plant is native to the mountainous areas of Southwest China, particularly Guizhou, Sichuan and Yunnan, as well as Myanmar. It lives in valleys and forests at elevations between 1,400 and 3,000 m (4,600 and 9,800 ft).

== Cultivation ==
Jasminum polyanthum is well known as a house plant in the US and Europe. It grows fast and easily, and flowers well. It can also grow in the garden, when climate conditions are good; but it cannot tolerate freezing temperatures (USDA hardiness zones: 8 - 11). Outside it can be used to cover walls and fences etc., in suitable climates, in sun or light shade. It is propagated by seed and by suckers.

Jasminum polyanthum was given the Award of Garden Merit (AGM) by the RHS in 1993. It was chosen on the Bicentenary list of 200 plants for the RHS: “This popular houseplant is an easily-grown, evergreen, half-hardy climber with loose panicles in summer of many strongly-fragrant pink-backed, white, trumpet-shaped flowers. It does not suffer pest or disease problems and is simple to propagate.”

== Invasive species ==
Jasminum polyanthum is naturalized in Australia and New Zealand. It can be regarded as an invasive species in these regions. This species of jasmine spreads rapidly as it can grow from any small section of stem material. The stems layer profusely and runners spread long distances. It is highly shade tolerant and can flower under a full canopy. It forms dense ground cover, preventing the growth of native seedlings, and smothers all other vegetation up to mid-canopy level. Spread into established forest, for instance in New Zealand, is rapid.

It can be controlled by cutting the stem and branches and applying herbicides to the cut surfaces. Chemical control of ground cover is advised.

== Gallery ==
Pink jasmine flower buds

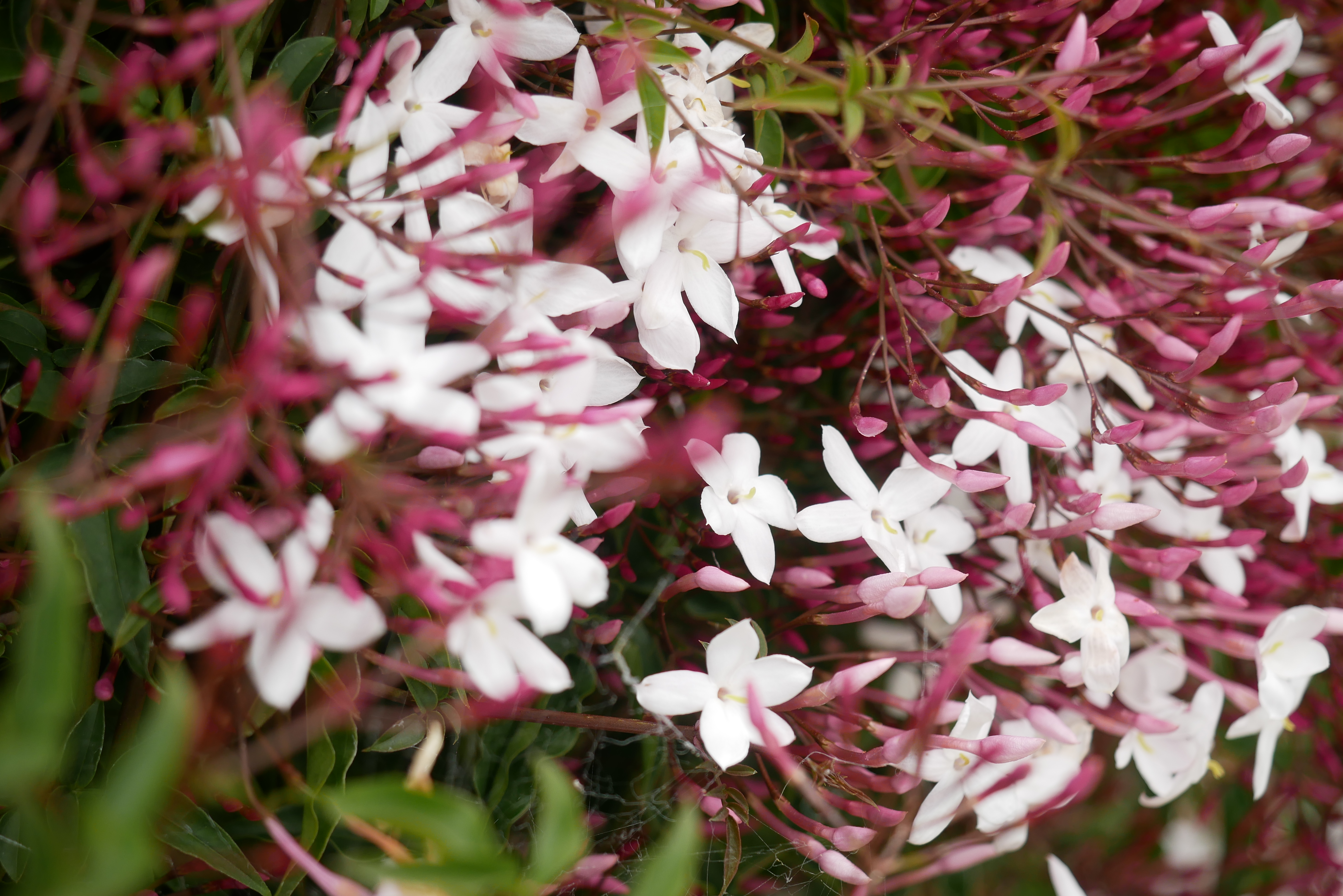
Pink jasmine in bloom

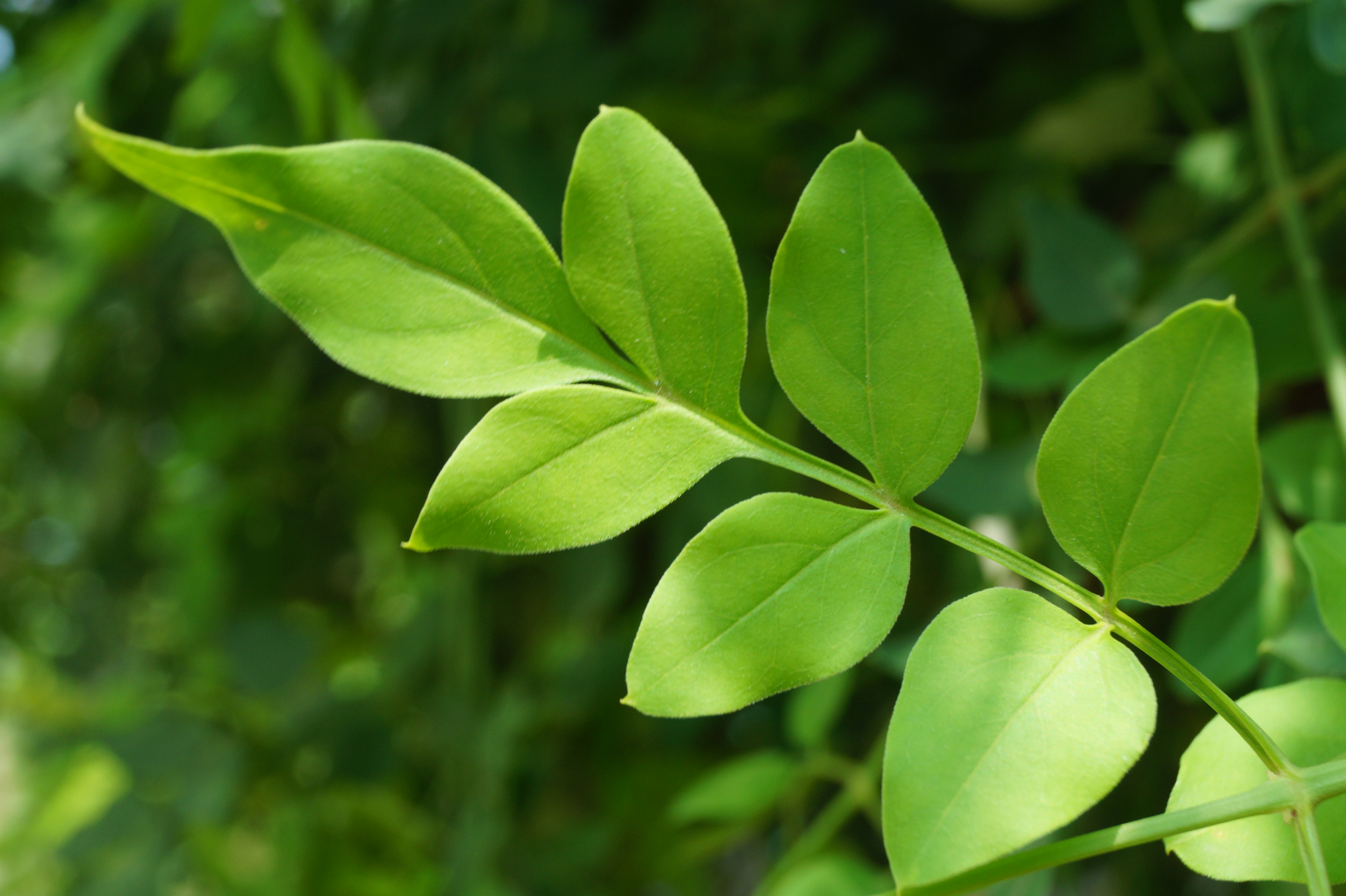
7 leaflets
