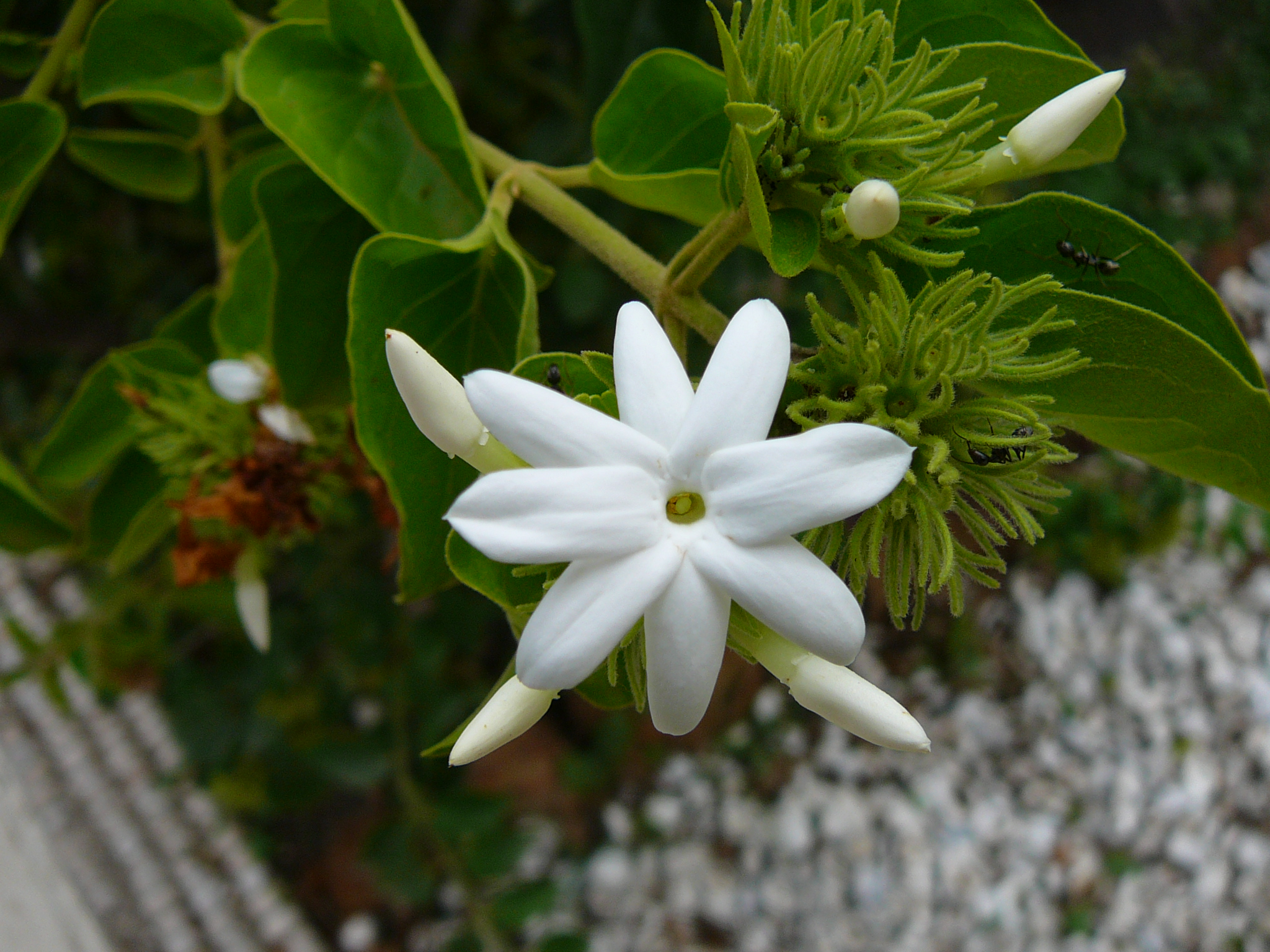

Scientific classification
- Kingdom: Plantae
- Clade: Tracheophytes
- Clade: Angiosperms
- Clade: Eudicots
- Clade: Asterids
- Order: Lamiales
- Family: Oleaceae
- Genus: Jasminum
- Species: J. multiflorum

Binomial name
- Jasminum multiflorum (Burm. f.) Andrews

= Jasminum multiflorum =

Star jasmine

Species of jasmine

Jasminum multiflorum, commonly known as star jasmine, is a species of jasmine in the family Oleaceae.

In Indian mythology, Kund is known for its whiteness. So, instead of the common western phrase 'white as snow', what often appears in Hindu mythological stories is 'white as kunda'. Also, beautiful white teeth are often compared to Kunda buds. It is held to be especially sacred to Vishnu. In Manipur, Kundo flowers are used in worship, and are an essential part of a marriage ceremony. The bride garlands the groom with two Kundo flower garlands. The groom then takes one of the two and garlands the bride.

== Distribution ==
Jasminum multiflorum is native to India, Nepal, Bhutan, Laos, Burma, Thailand, and Vietnam. It is widely cultivated in tropical and subtropical regions. While Jasmine flowers are known for its attractive and intensely fragrant flower, this species does not have any scent. The species is reportedly naturalised in Florida, Chiapas, Central America, Queensland, and much of the West Indies.

== Etymology ==
Jasminum is a Latinized form of the Arabic ياسمين yasemin, which refers to sweetly scented plants.
