= Jasminum calophyllum =

Scientific classification
- Kingdom: Plantae
- Clade: Tracheophytes
- Clade: Angiosperms
- Clade: Eudicots
- Clade: Asterids
- Order: Lamiales
- Family: Oleaceae
- Genus: Jasminum
- Species: J. calophyllum

Binomial name
- Jasminum calophyllum Wall. ex G.Don

Species of jasmine

Jasminum calophyllum is a species of jasmine, in the family Oleaceae.
