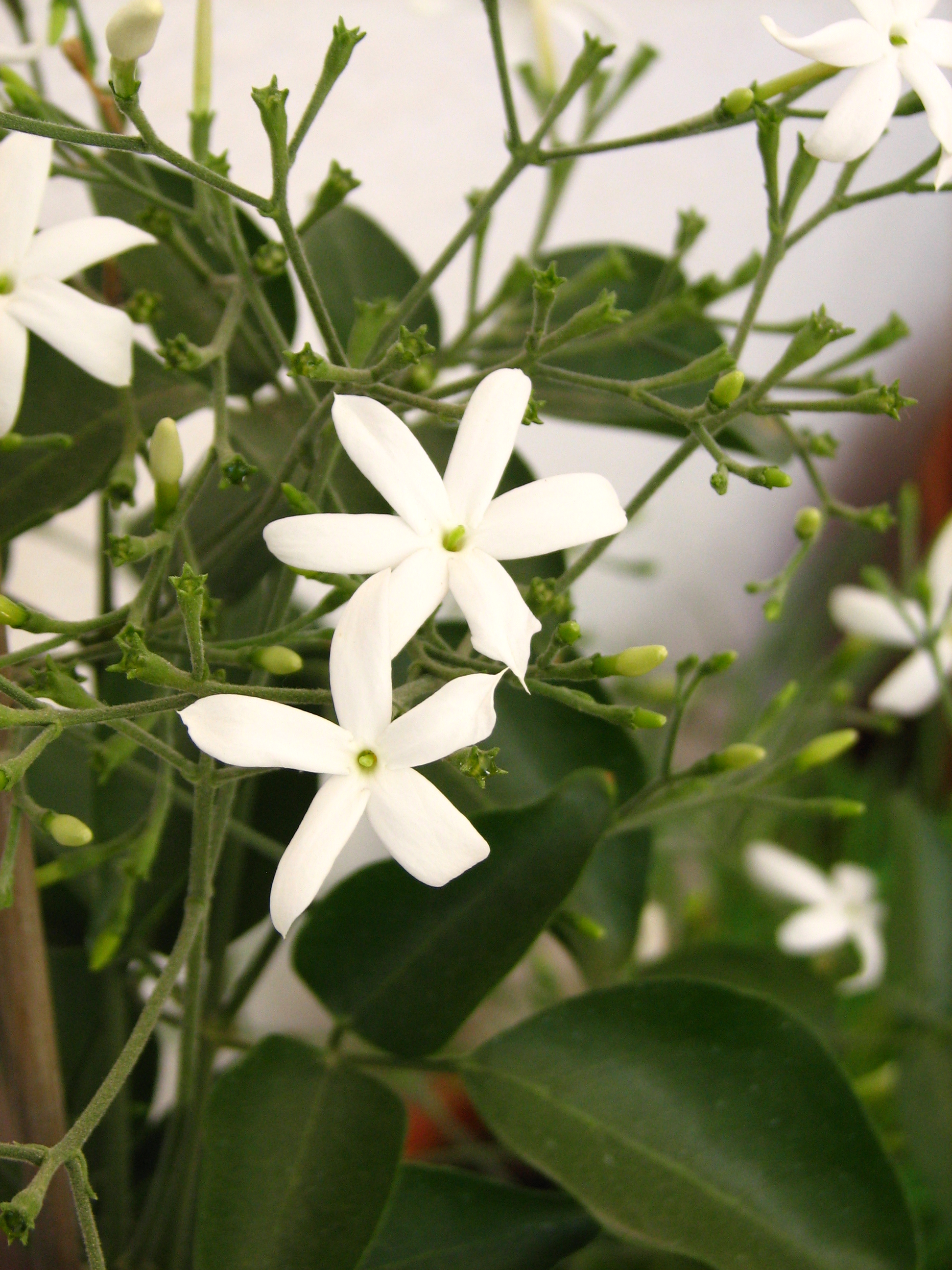

Conservation status
- Critically Endangered (IUCN 3.1)

Scientific classification
- Kingdom: Plantae
- Clade: Tracheophytes
- Clade: Angiosperms
- Clade: Eudicots
- Clade: Asterids
- Order: Lamiales
- Family: Oleaceae
- Genus: Jasminum
- Species: J. azoricum

Binomial name
- Jasminum azoricum L.

= Jasminum azoricum =

Species of vine

Jasminum azoricum, the lemon-scented jasmine, is a species of flowering plant in the olive family. It is an evergreen twining vine native to the Portuguese island of Madeira. The compound leaves consist of 3 bright green leaflets. The fragrant white star-shaped flowers appear in panicles from the leaf axils in summer, evolving from deep pink buds.

The species is critically endangered in its native Madeira. Reports of remaining populations vary between 6 and 50 individual plants in two separate areas, Funchal and Ribeira Brava.

Jasminum azoricum, which does not tolerate freezing temperatures, has long been in cultivation in Europe as a greenhouse plant with records in Netherlands since 1693 and England from about 1724. It has been prized for its bright evergreen foliage, long flowering period and scented blooms. Plants are readily propagated from cuttings and by layering. The species prefers a sunny, frost-free position with support from structures such as fences or posts.

In the UK this plant has gained the Royal Horticultural Society's Award of Garden Merit.
