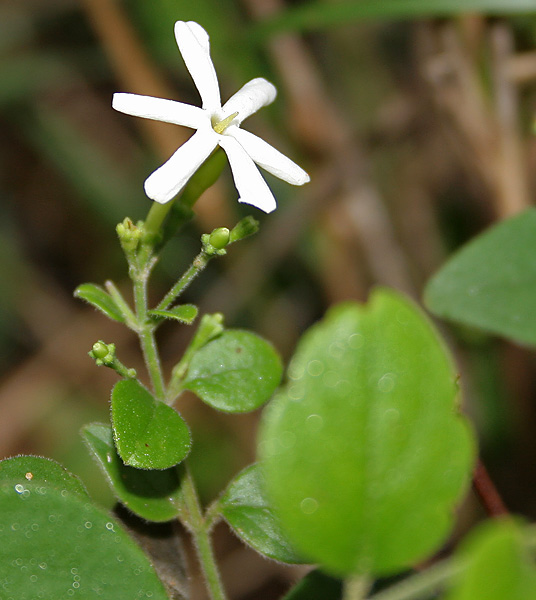

Scientific classification
- Kingdom: Plantae
- Clade: Tracheophytes
- Clade: Angiosperms
- Clade: Eudicots
- Clade: Asterids
- Order: Lamiales
- Family: Oleaceae
- Genus: Jasminum
- Species: J. auriculatum

Binomial name
- Jasminum auriculatum Vahl

= Jasminum auriculatum =

Species of jasmine

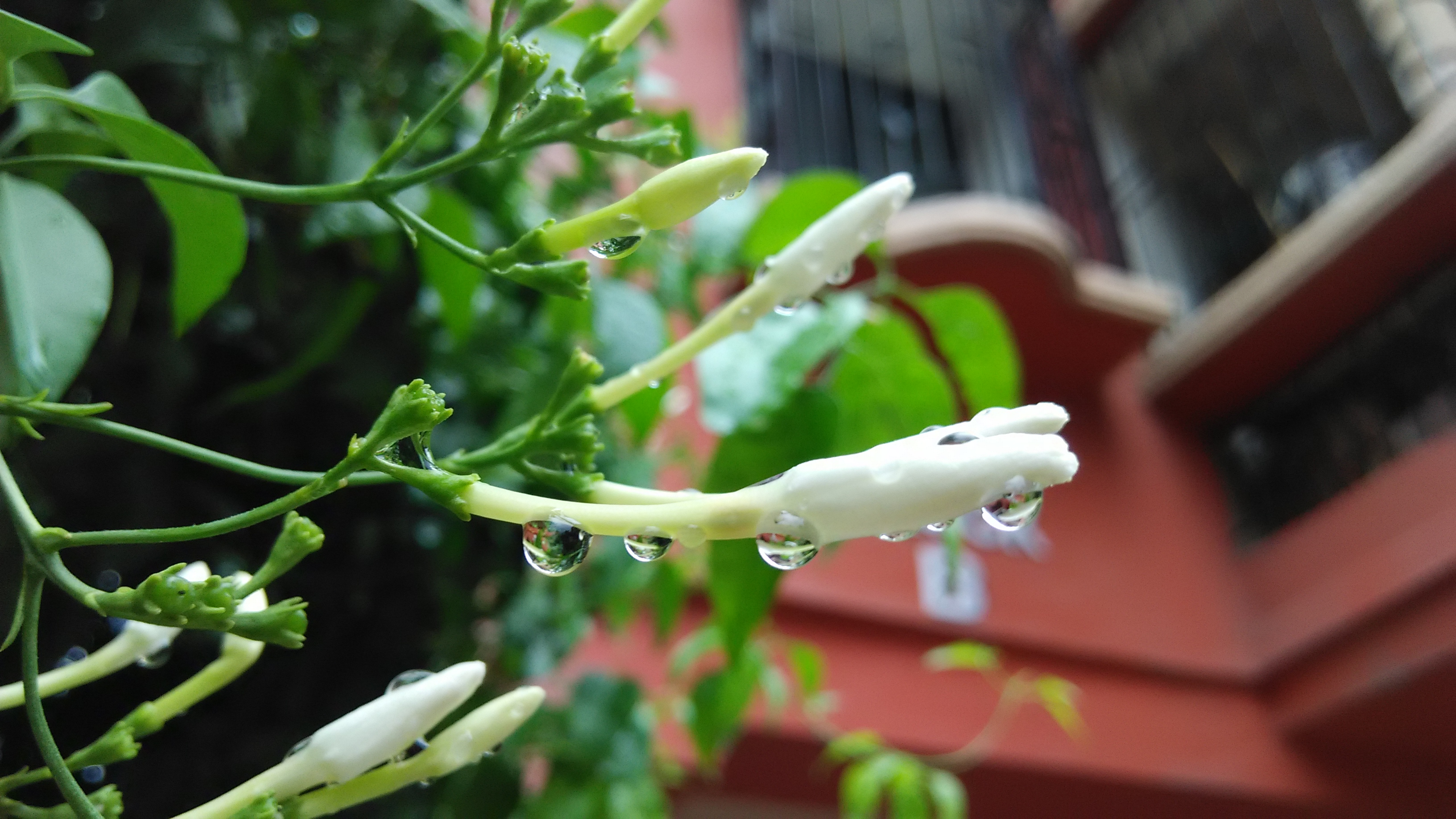
Rain drops on jasmine bud

Jasminum auriculatum is a species of jasmine, in the family Oleaceae. It is found in India, Nepal, Sri Lanka, Bhutan and the Andaman Islands. Due to essential oil contained in the flowers, it is cultivated commercially in India and Thailand. It is used for decorative purposes and festivals in India.

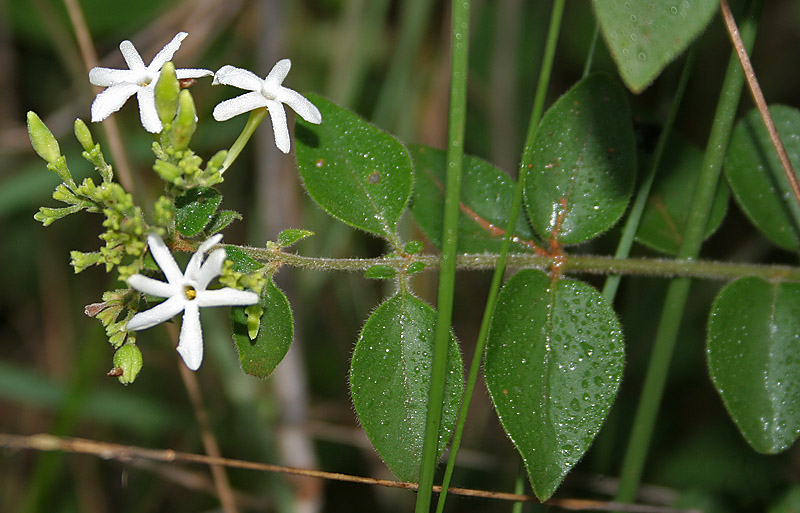
Shot at Chittoor in Andhra Pradesh, India

== Etymology ==
'Jasminum' is a Latinized form of the Arabic word, 'yasemin' for sweetly scented plants.
