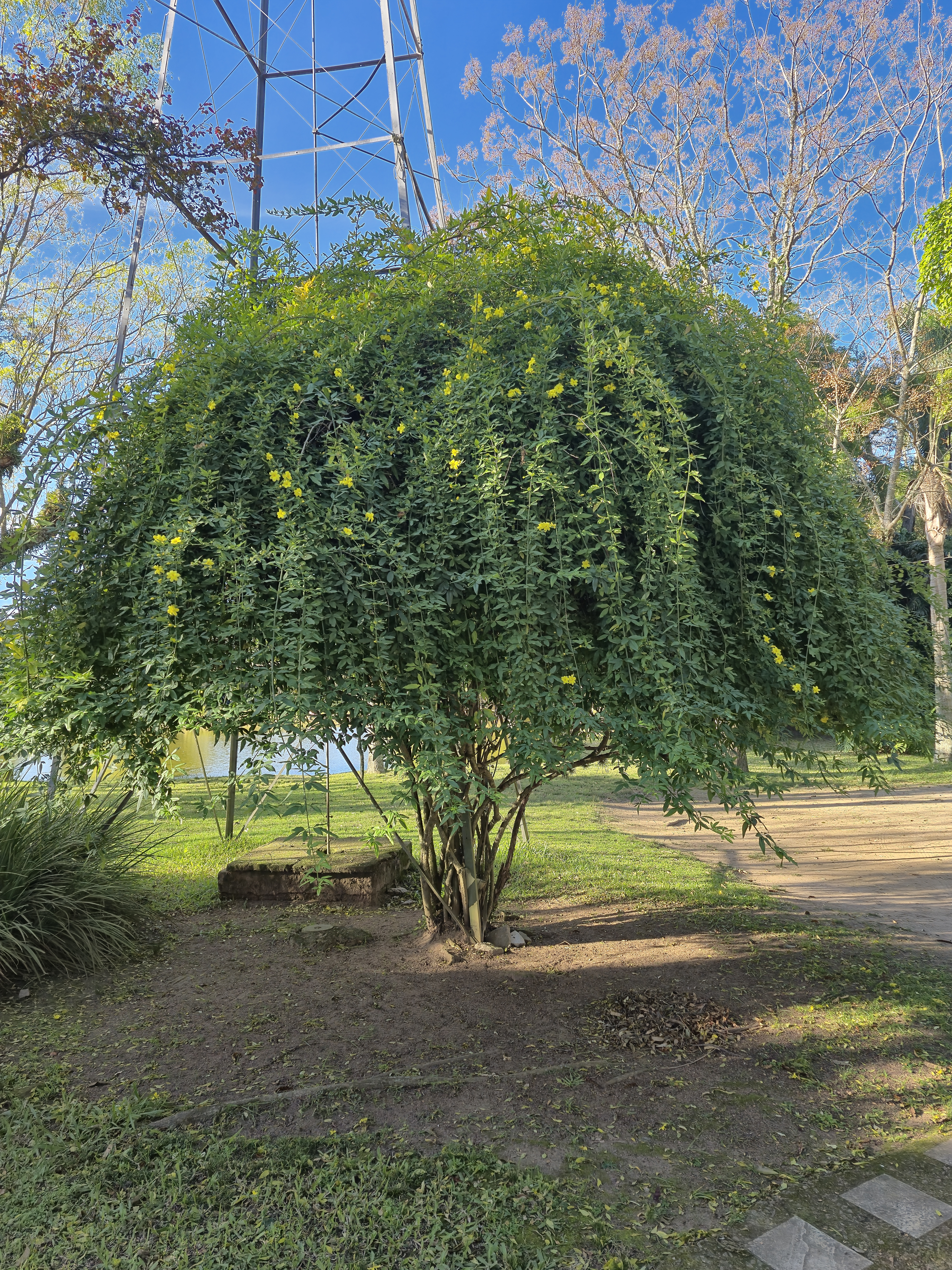
- In Brazil

Scientific classification
- Kingdom: Plantae
- Clade: Embryophytes
- Clade: Tracheophytes
- Clade: Spermatophytes
- Clade: Angiosperms
- Clade: Eudicots
- Clade: Asterids
- Order: Lamiales
- Family: Oleaceae
- Genus: Jasminum
- Species: J. mesnyi

Binomial name
- Jasminum mesnyi Hance

Synonyms
- Jasminum primulinum Hemsl. ex Baker

= Jasminum mesnyi =

Primrose jasmine

Species of jasmine

Jasminum mesnyi, the primrose jasmine or Japanese jasmine, is a species of flowering plant in the family Oleaceae, native to Vietnam and southern China (Guizhou, Sichuan, Yunnan). It is named in honour of William Mesny.

Jasminum mesnyi has gained the Royal Horticultural Society's Award of Garden Merit. Essential oil is used in perfumery.

== Description ==
Jasminum mesnyi is a scrambling, evergreen shrub growing to 3 m (10 ft) tall by 1–2 m (3–7 ft) wide, with fragrant yellow flowers in spring and summer (though it may flower all year round in warmer climates). It grows mainly in the subtropical biome and its climbing habits can be arranged to constitute a dense shrub.

It has opposite, glossy, lanceolate leaves, 3–7 cm long, leaf blade broadly ovate or elliptic, sometimes suborbicular, trifoliate, simple at the base of the branchlets, petiole 0.5-1.5 cm; yellow flowers, 3 cm, solitary, on short axillary shoots, rarely terminal; Leafy, obovate or lanceolate bracts, 5–10 mm, surrounded by small foliaceous bracts; 5-6-calyx, narrow lobes; semi-double yellow corolla, with obtuse lobes. Spherical fruit, 8 mm, blackish, fleshy walls.

Variation in flower form
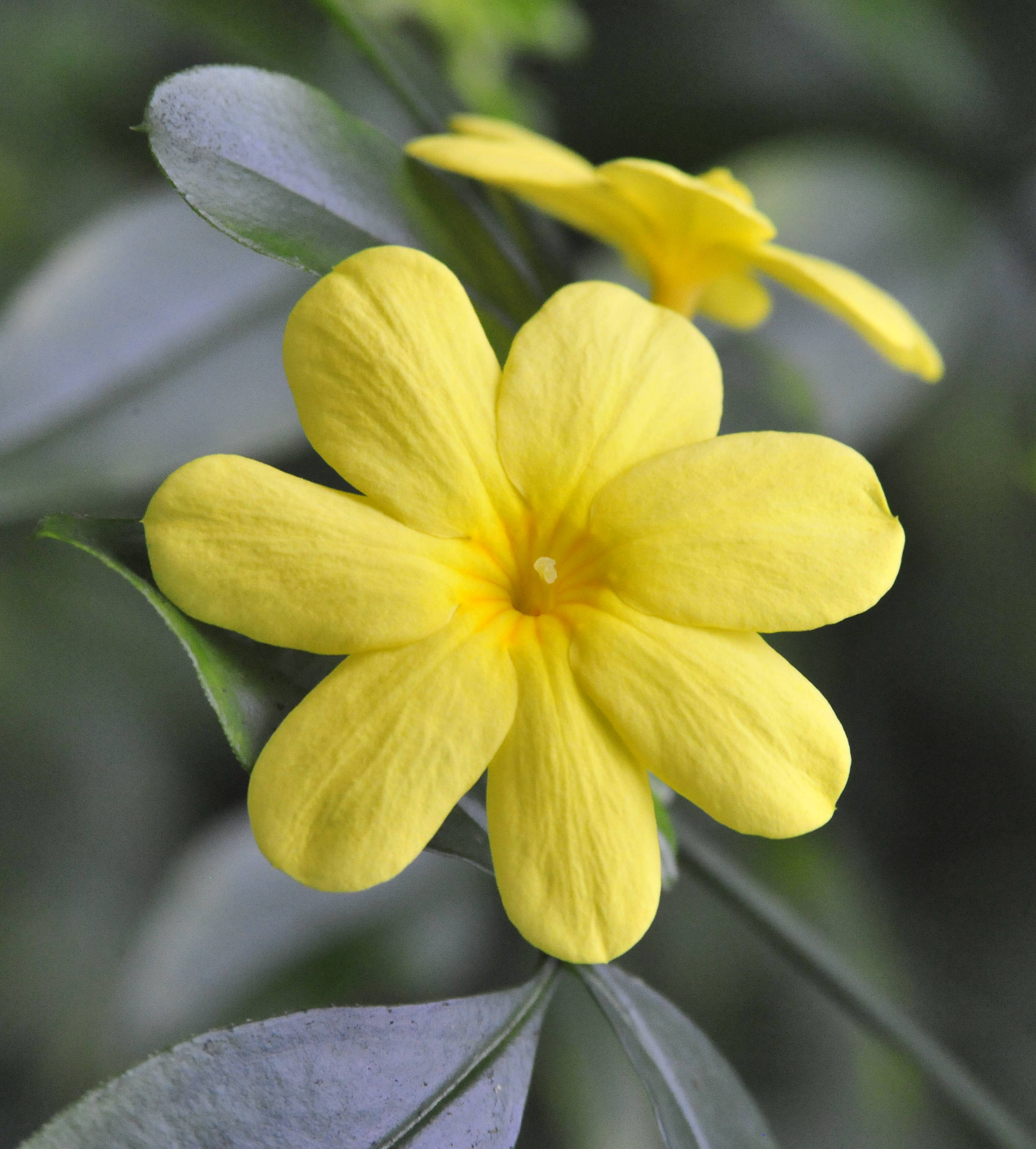
Single

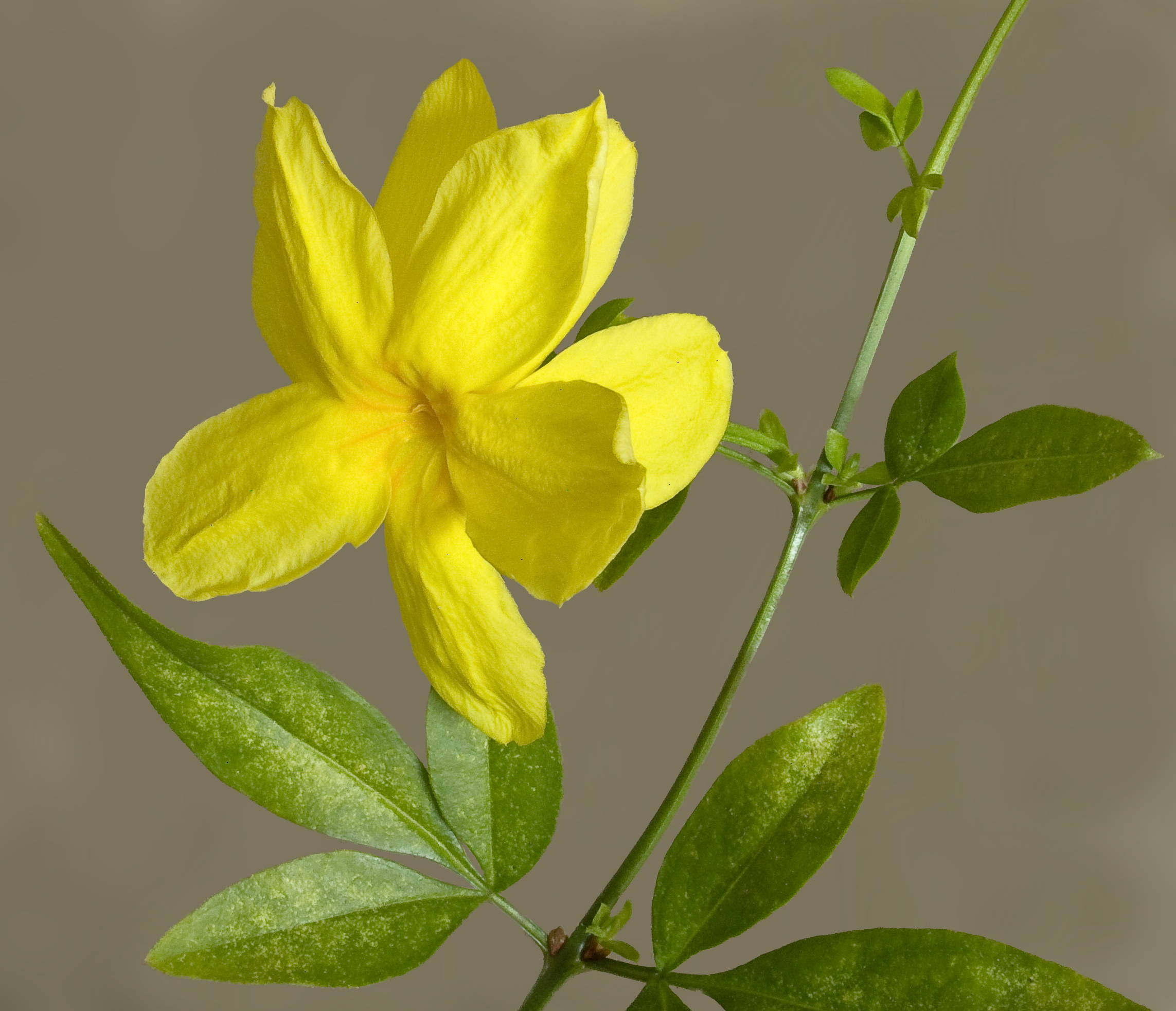
Semi-double

== Cultivation ==
The form usually found in cultivation has semi-double flowers. It is not frost-hardy. With suitable support it can be grown as a slender climber, though in confined spaces it will require regular pruning.

== Naturalization ==
It is also reportedly naturalized in Mexico, Honduras and parts of the southern United States (Florida, Georgia, Alabama, Louisiana, Texas, Arizona).

== Gallery ==
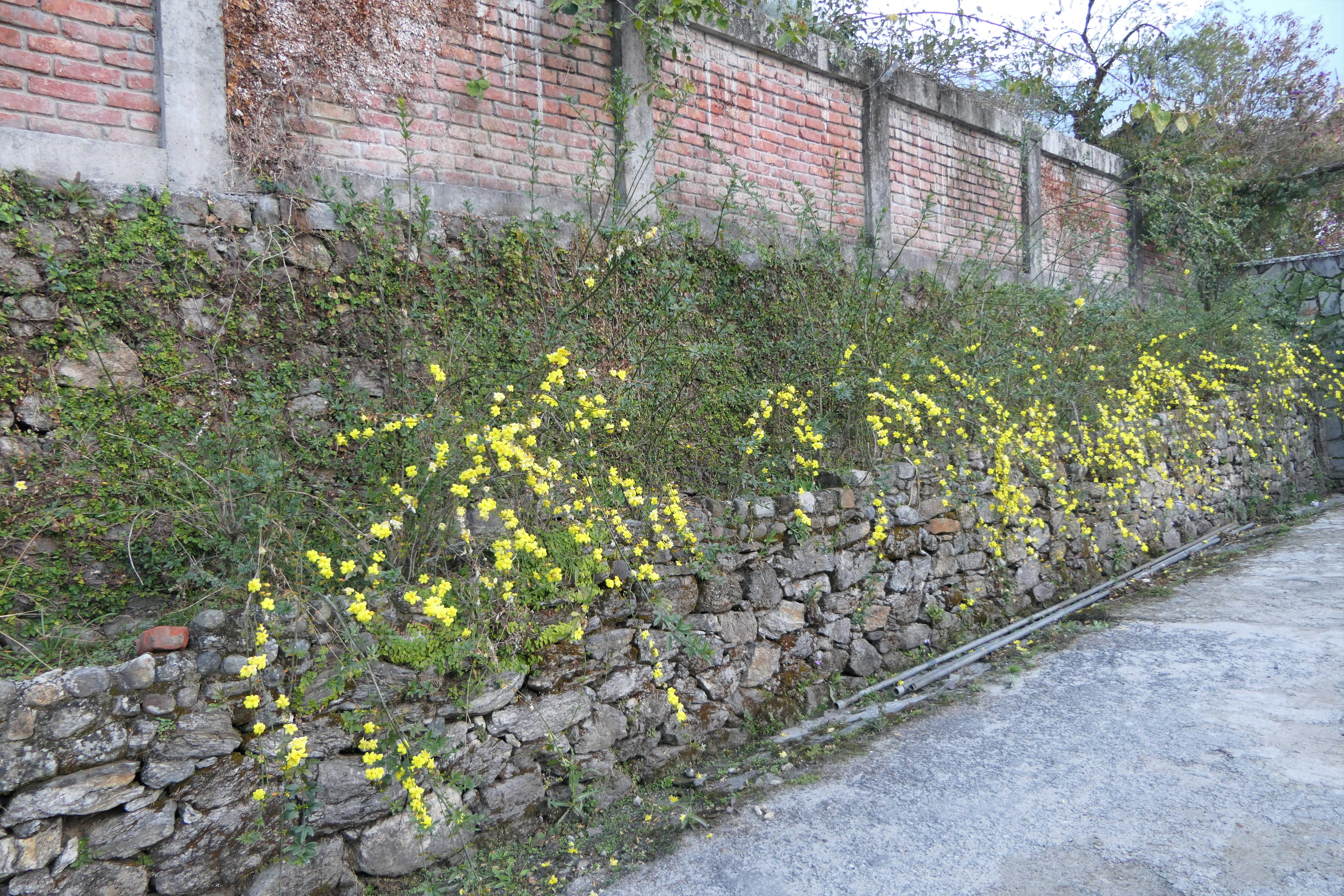
A hedgy shrub

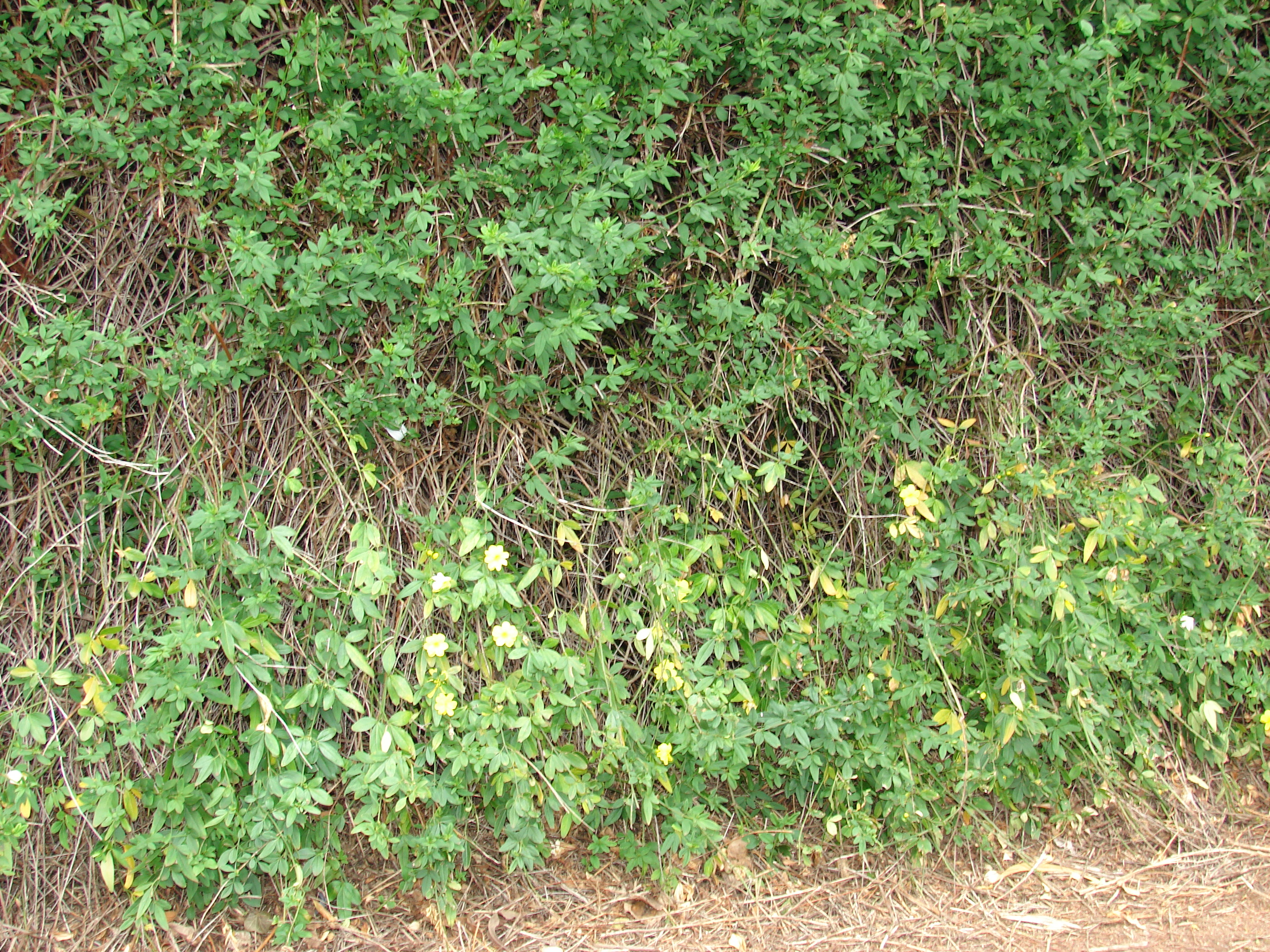
Rambling on side of road

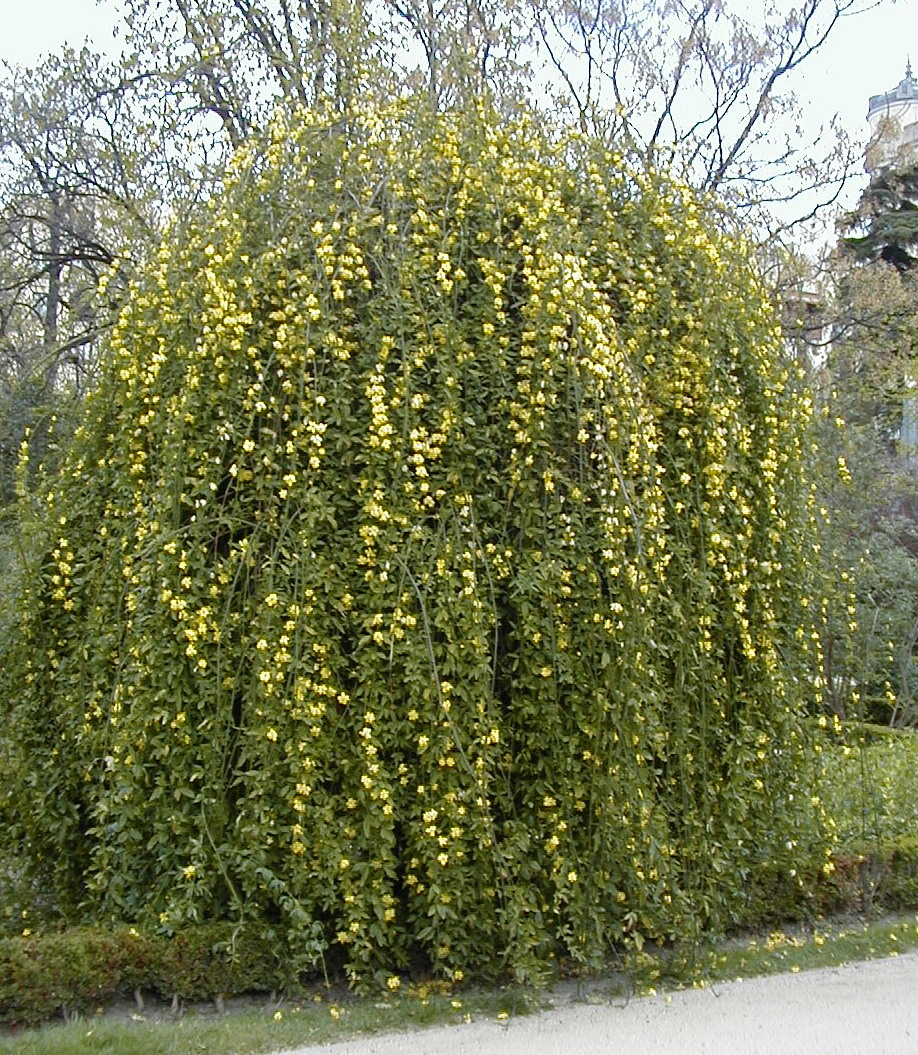
Weeping form

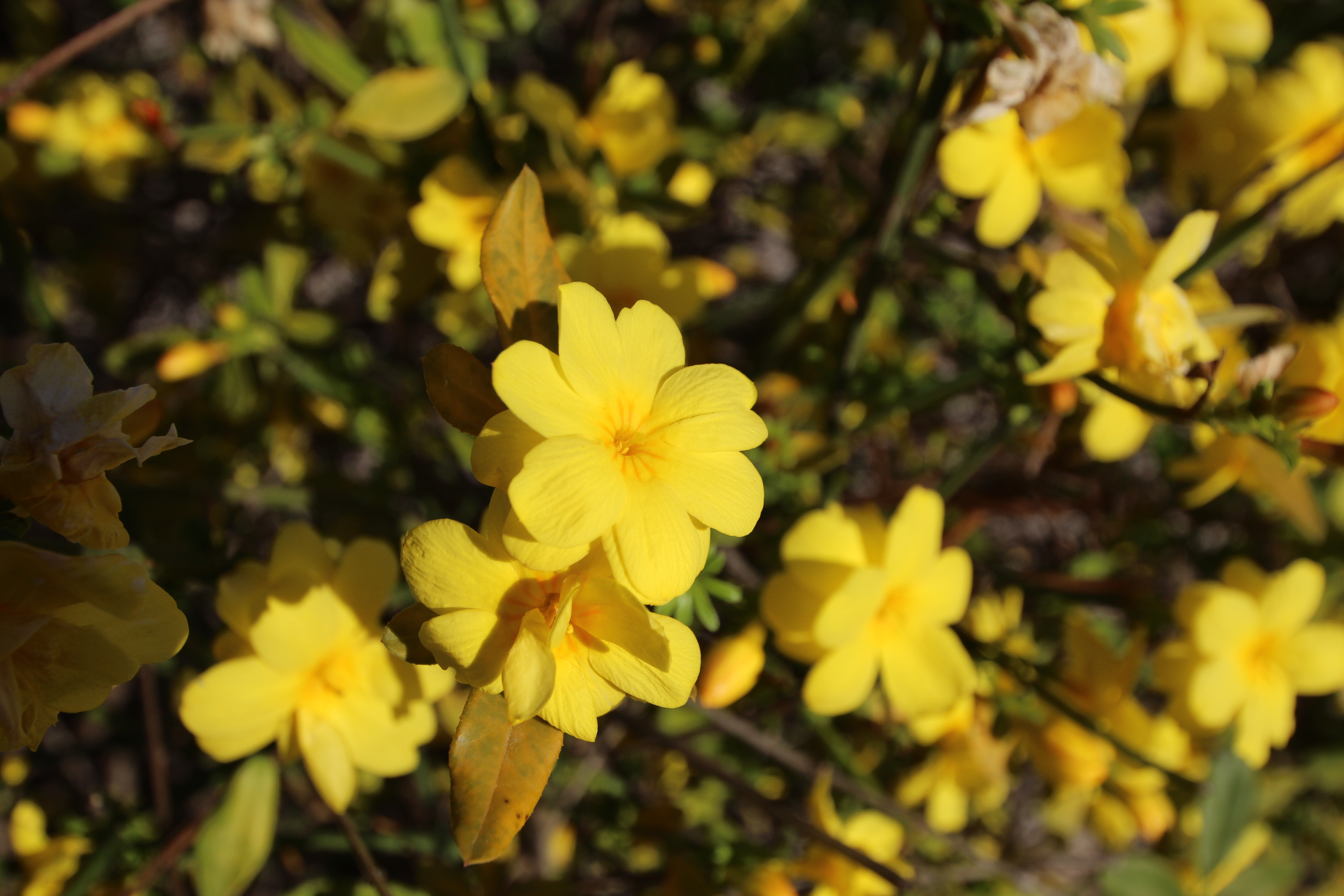
Bunch of flowers

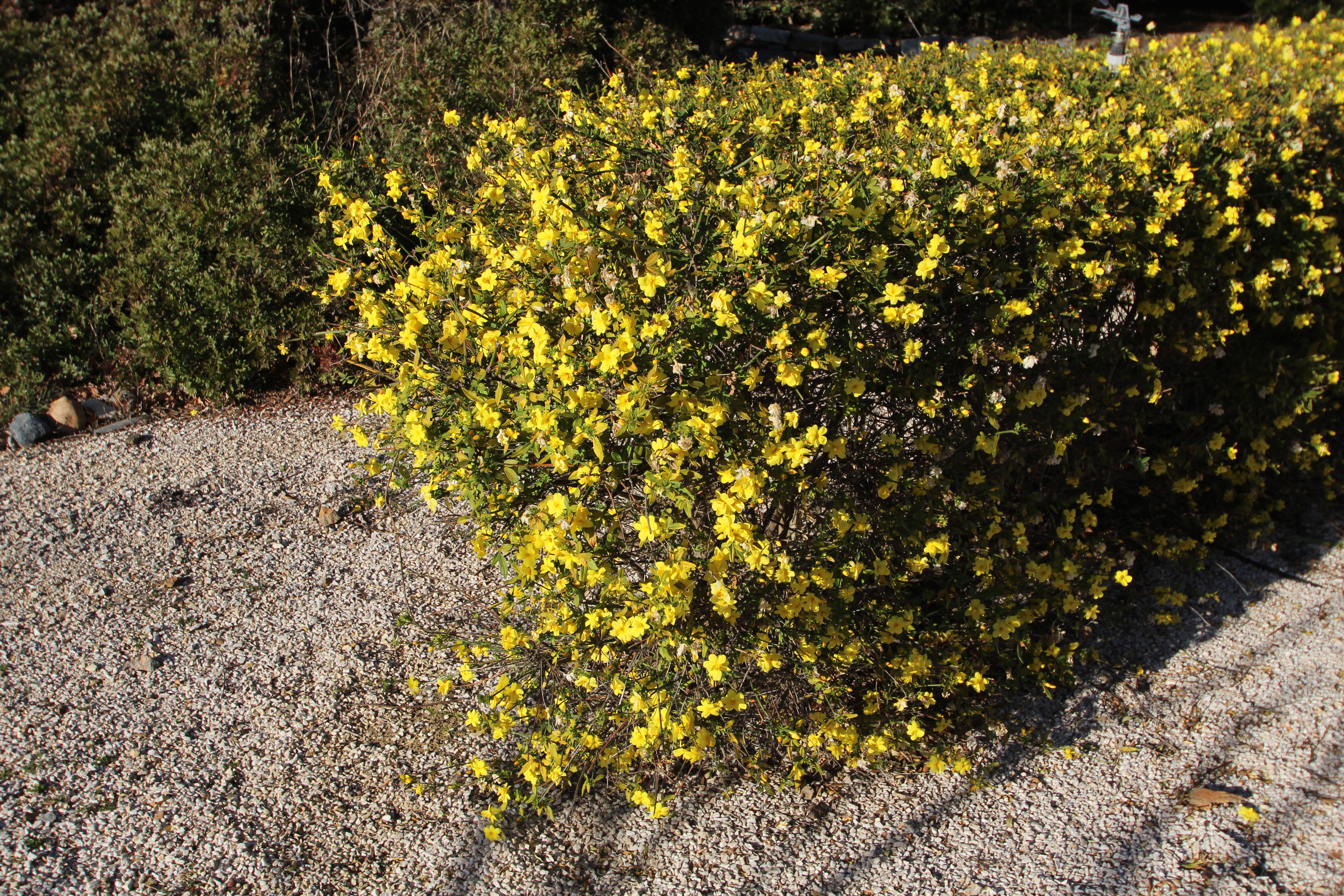
Hedge

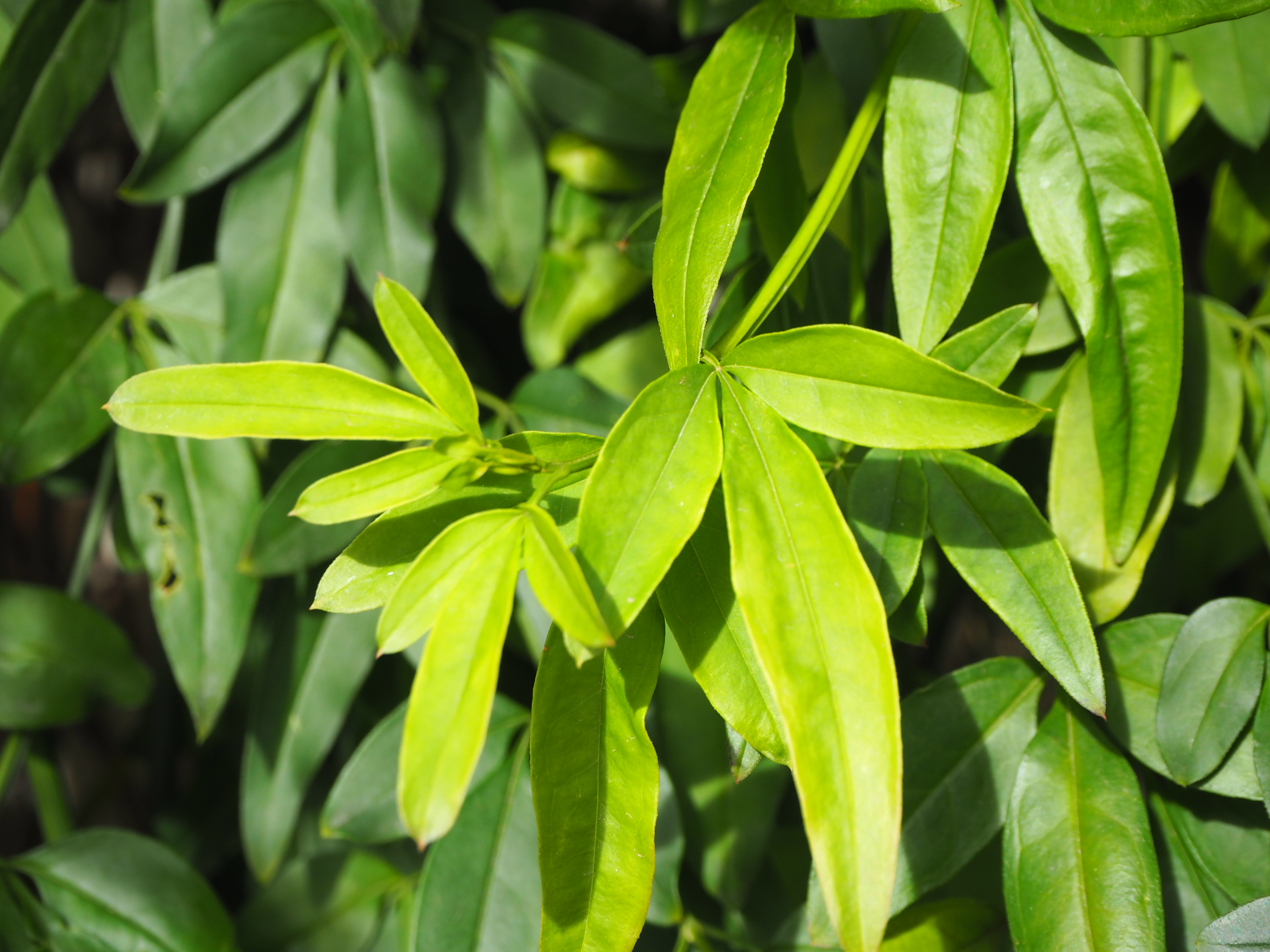
New leaf growth

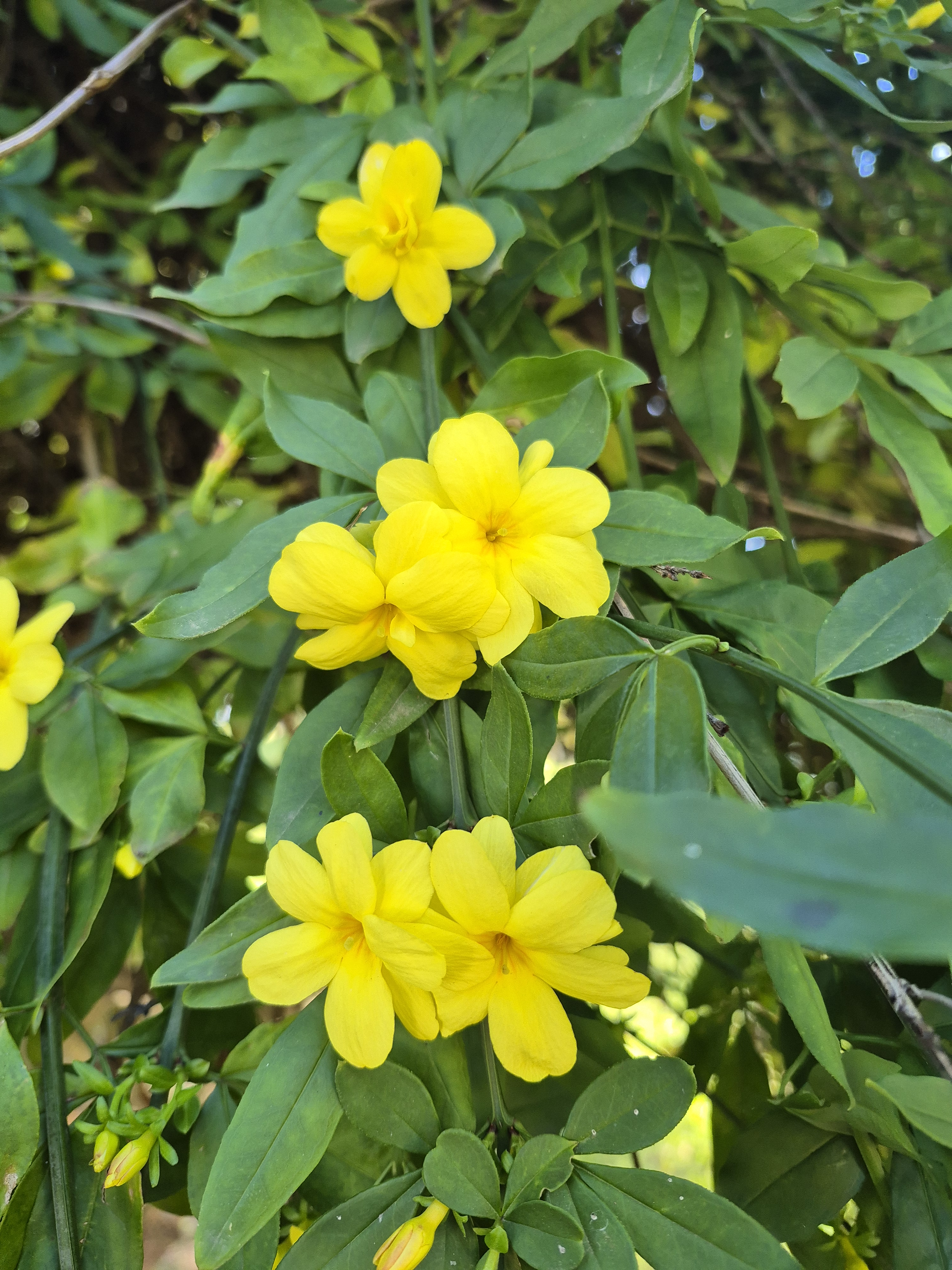
Flowers
