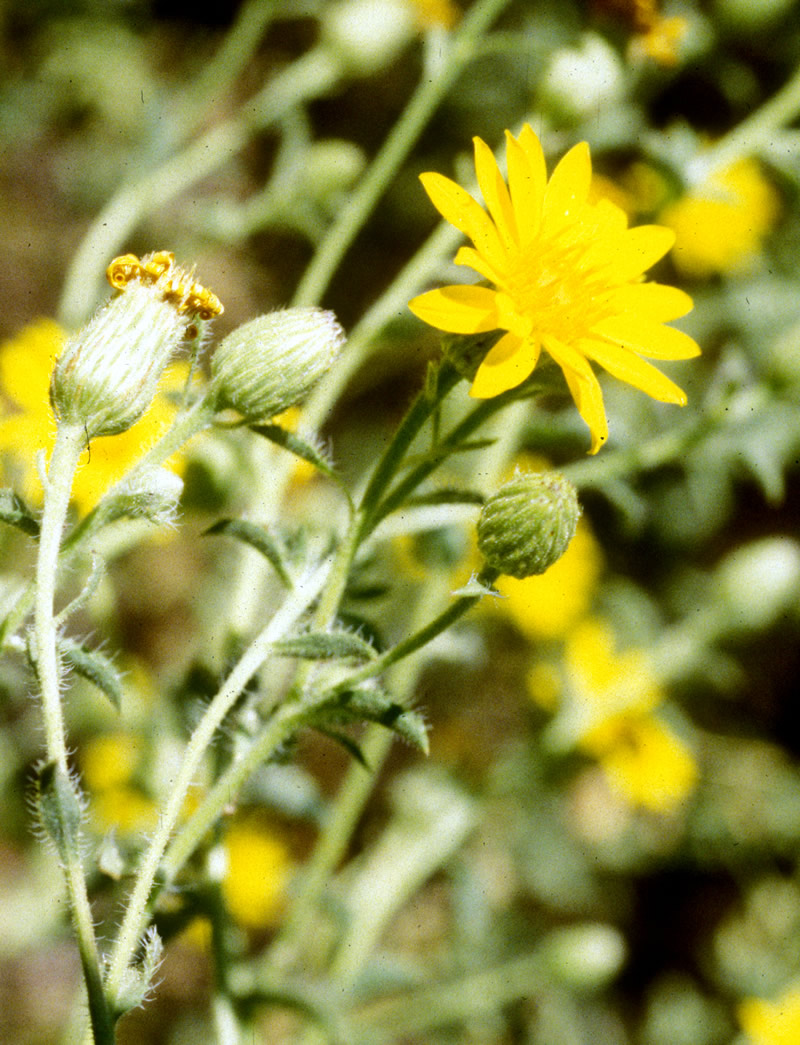
- Heterotheca shevockii

Scientific classification
- Kingdom: Plantae
- Clade: Embryophytes
- Clade: Tracheophytes
- Clade: Spermatophytes
- Clade: Angiosperms
- Clade: Eudicots
- Clade: Asterids
- Order: Asterales
- Family: Asteraceae
- Subfamily: Asteroideae
- Tribe: Astereae
- Subtribe: Chrysopsidinae
- Genus: Heterotheca; Cass.

Type species
- Heterotheca lamarckii syn of H. subaxillaris Cass.

Synonyms
- Ammodia Nutt.; Calycium Elliott; Diplocoma D.Don ex D.Don; Stelmanis Raf.

= Heterotheca =

Genus of plants

Heterotheca (common names goldenasters, camphorweed, and telegraph weed) is a genus of North American plants in the family Asteraceae.

== Etymology ==
Heterotheca (heterothe'ca:) comes from Ancient Greek ἕτερος héteros "other, different" and θήκη thḗkē "case, chest" (botanically, "ovary") and refers to the difference in shape, in some species in the genus, between the cypselae (achenes containing seed) of the disk and ray florets.

== Description, biology ==
These are annual and perennial herbs bearing daisy-like flower heads with yellow disc florets and usually yellow ray florets, associated with mesic to xeric habitats across North America. Several species now included in Heterotheca were previously classified in the genus Chrysopsis.

Heterotheca species are used as food plants by the caterpillars of some species of Lepidoptera including Schinia lynx, Schinia nubila and Schinia saturata (all of which have been recorded on Heterotheca subaxillaris).

== Chemistry ==
The leaf volatiles from which the name "camphorweed" is derived include camphor, but as a minor constituent (less than 2%); of the 41 documented volatiles in Heterotheca subaxillaris, for example, caryophyllene, pinene, borneol, myrcene, and limonene each comprise over 5% of the total.

== Species ==
The following species are recognized in the genus Heterotheca:

- Heterotheca angustifolia (Rydb.) G.L.Nesom - southeastern Colorado to central U.S.A
- Heterotheca arenaria (Elmer) G.L.Nesom - California
- Heterotheca arizonica (Semple) G.L.Nesom - Arizona to western Texas and Mexico (Chihuahua)
- Heterotheca ballardii (Rydb.) G.L.Nesom - central Canada to northwestern & northern central U.S.A.
- Heterotheca bolanderi (A.Gray) V.L.Harms - California
- Heterotheca brandegeei (B.L.Rob. & Greenm.) Semple - northern Baja California
- Heterotheca camphorata (Eastw.) Semple - California
- Heterotheca camporum (Greene) Shinners - Arkansas, Missouri, Iowa, Illinois, Ohio, Michigan, Kentucky, Tennessee, Mississippi, Alabama, Georgia, Virginia, North Carolina, New Jersey
- Heterotheca canescens (DC.) Shinners - Nuevo León, Texas, New Mexico, Oklahoma, Colorado, Kansas, Missouri, Iowa
- Heterotheca chihuahuana (B.L.Turner & S.D.Sundb.) B.L.Turner - California
- Heterotheca cinerascens (S.F.Blake) G.L.Nesom - Idaho to Arizona
- Heterotheca cryptocephala (Wooton & Standl.) G.L.Nesom - southern and central New Mexico
- Heterotheca depressa (Rydb.) Dorn - Montana to northern Utah
- Heterotheca excelsior G.L.Nesom - Nevada (Spring Mountains)
- Heterotheca fastigiata (Greene) V.L.Harms - California
- Heterotheca fulciens G.L.Nesom - Nevada to Utah and Arizona
- Heterotheca fulcrata (Greene) Shinners - Coahuila, Tamaulipas, Arizona, New Mexico, Texas, Nevada, Utah, Colorado, Wyoming, Idaho
- Heterotheca grandiflora - telegraphweed - Baja California, California, Arizona, Nevada, Utah
- Heterotheca gypsophila B.L.Turner - Nuevo León
- Heterotheca harmsiana (Semple) G.L.Nesom - Mexico (Coahuila, Nuevo León, Zacatecas)
- Heterotheca hartmanii G.L.Nesom - Colorado, Wyoming
- Heterotheca hirsuta (Greene) G.L.Nesom - western and central Canada to northeastern and west-central U.S.A.
- Heterotheca hirsutissima (Greene) G.L.Nesom - Wyoming to northeastern Arizona and western Texas, Mexico (Nuevo León)
- Heterotheca hispida (Hook.) G.L.Nesom - western and central Canada to northwestern and west-central U.S.A.
- Heterotheca incensa G.L.Nesom - southwestern Wyoming to Utah
- Heterotheca inflata G.L.Nesom - eastern and southeastern Utah to Colorado
- Heterotheca inuloides Cass. - Mexican arnica - Nuevo León to Oaxaca
- Heterotheca jonesii (S.F.Blake) S.L.Welsh & N.D.Atwood - Utah
- Heterotheca joshuana G.L.Nesom - southern California
- Heterotheca komarekiae G.L.Nesom - Colorado
- Heterotheca loboensis G.L.Nesom - south-central U.S.A.
- Heterotheca marcbakeri G.L.Nesom - west-central Arizona
- Heterotheca marginata Semple - Arizona
- Heterotheca mayoensis G.L.Nesom - northern Mexico
- Heterotheca mexicana V.L.Harms ex B.L.Turner - Durango
- Heterotheca monarchensis D.A.York, Shevock & Semple - monarch golden aster - Fresno County in California
- Heterotheca mucronata V.L.Harms ex B.L.Turner - Nuevo León, Coahuila, Tamaulipas
- Heterotheca nitidula (Wooton & Standl.) G.L.Nesom - eastern Arizona to western and west-central New Mexico
- Heterotheca oregona (Nutt.) Shinners - Washington to California
- Heterotheca orovillosa G.L.Nesom - southwestern Oregon to California and western Nevada
- Heterotheca paniculata G.L.Nesom - Colorado to central New Mexico
- Heterotheca pedunculata (Greene) G.L.Nesom - Arizona to Colorado and New Mexico
- Heterotheca polothrix G.L.Nesom - western and southwestern Colorado to northern & eastern Arizona
- Heterotheca postpetrinis G.L.Nesom - Utah
- Heterotheca pumila (Greene) Semple - Colorado, Wyoming, Utah, New Mexico
- Heterotheca resinolens (A.Nelson) G.L.Nesom - southern Wyoming to Colorado
- Heterotheca rosei (B.Wagenkn.) G.L.Nesom - Mexico
- Heterotheca rudis (Greene) G.L.Nesom - western Oregon to northern and northwestern California
- Heterotheca rutteri (Rothr.) Shinners - Arizona, Sonora
- Heterotheca sanctarum G.L.Nesom - California
- Heterotheca sandersii G.L.Nesom - southern California
- Heterotheca scaberrima (A.Gray) G.L.Nesom - California
- Heterotheca scabrifolia (A.Nelson) G.L.Nesom - southern Nebraska to Texas
- Heterotheca scelionis G.L.Nesom - Oregon
- Heterotheca schneideri G.L.Nesom - southwestern Colorado
- Heterotheca sessiliflora (Nutt.) Shinners - sessileflower false golden aster - Baja California, California
- Heterotheca shevockii (Semple) Semple - Kern Canyon false golden aster - Kern County in California
- Heterotheca sierrablancensis (Semple) G.L.Nesom - south-central New Mexico.
- Heterotheca stenophylla (A.Gray) Shinners - Texas, New Mexico, Oklahoma, Colorado, Wyoming, Kansas, Nebraska, South Dakota, Iowa, Minnesota
- Heterotheca subaxillaris (Lam.) Britton & Rusby - camphorweed, camphor weed, false goldenaster - widespread from Belize to California, South Dakota, and Massachusetts
- Heterotheca thiniicola (Rzed. & E.Ezcurra) B.L.Turner
- Heterotheca utahensis G.L.Nesom - southern Idaho to northwestern Colorado
- Heterotheca vespertina G.L.Nesom - western Canada to northwestern U.S.A.
- Heterotheca villosa (Pursh) Shinners - central Canada to central U.S.A.
- Heterotheca villosissima (DC.) G.L.Nesom - California
- Heterotheca viridis (G.L.Nesom) G.L.Nesom - Mexico (Oaxaca)
- Heterotheca viscida (A.Gray) V.L.Harms - Arizona, New Mexico, Texas
- Heterotheca wisconsinensis (Shinners) Shinners - central Wisconsin
- Heterotheca zionensis Semple - Zion golden aster - Arizona, New Mexico, Texas, Utah, Idaho, Wyoming

=== Formerly included ===
Many species have been included in Heterotheca at various times in the past, but are now regarded as sharing ancestry with other genera. The most common of these genera is Chrysopsis, but others include Aster, Bradburia, Osbertia, Munnozia, Pityopsis and Tomentaurum.
