= Camphorweed =

Camphorweed is a common name for several plants and may refer to:

- Heterotheca subaxillaris, native to North America
- Pluchea
