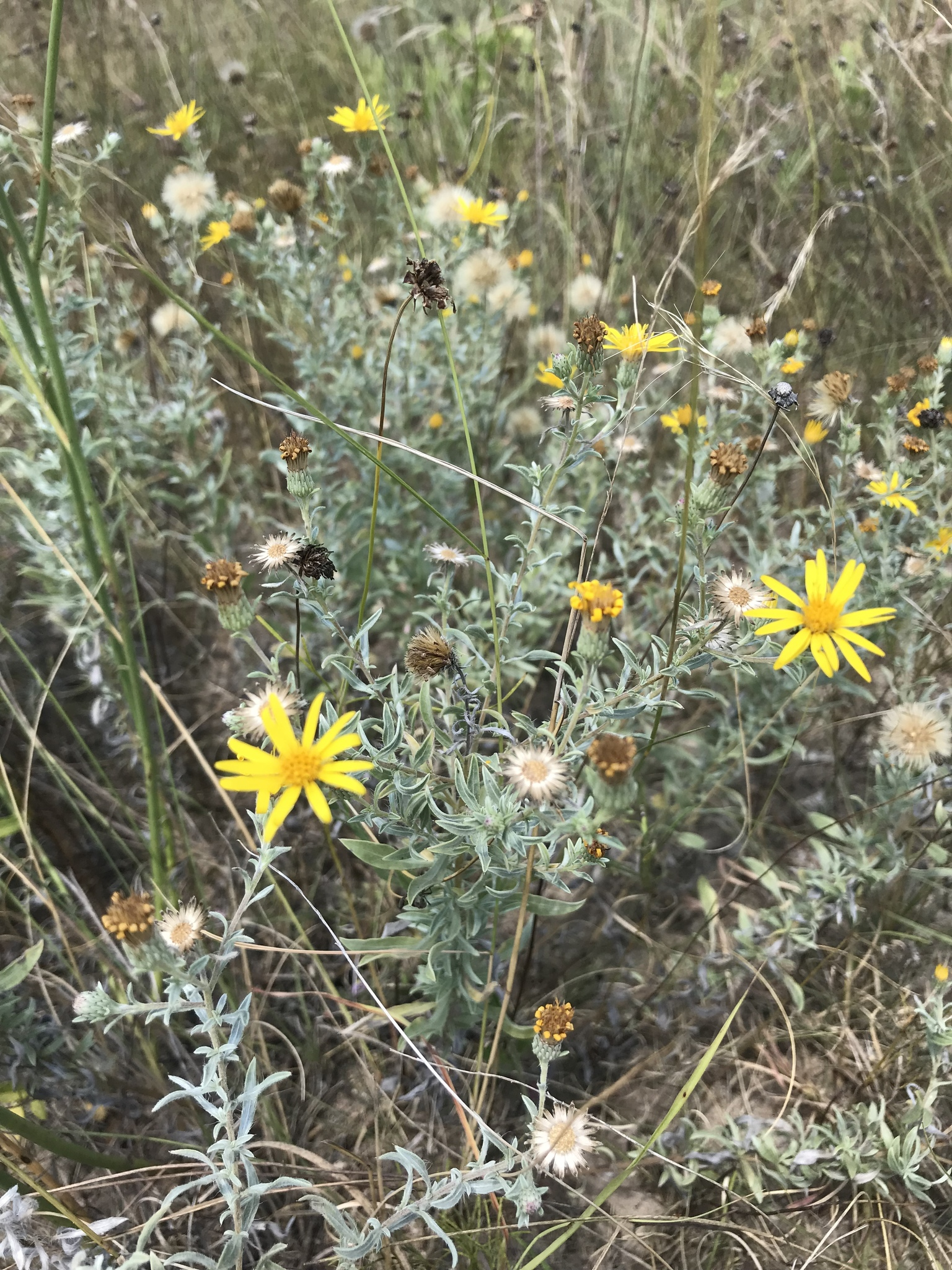

Conservation status
- Secure (NatureServe)

Scientific classification
- Kingdom: Plantae
- Clade: Tracheophytes
- Clade: Angiosperms
- Clade: Eudicots
- Clade: Asterids
- Order: Asterales
- Family: Asteraceae
- Genus: Heterotheca
- Species: H. canescens

Binomial name
- Heterotheca canescens (DC.) Shinners 1951

Synonyms
- Haplopappus canescens DC. 1836; Chrysopsis canescens (DC.) Torr. & A. Gray 1842 not DC. 1836; Chrysopsis villosa var. canescens (DC.) A. Gray; Chrysopsis berlandieri Greene

= Heterotheca canescens =

Species of flowering plant

Heterotheca canescens, common name hoary goldenaster, is a North American species of flowering plant in the family Asteraceae. It has been found in northern Mexico (Nuevo León) and in the Great Plains of the central United States (Colorado, New Mexico, Texas, Oklahoma, and Kansas).
