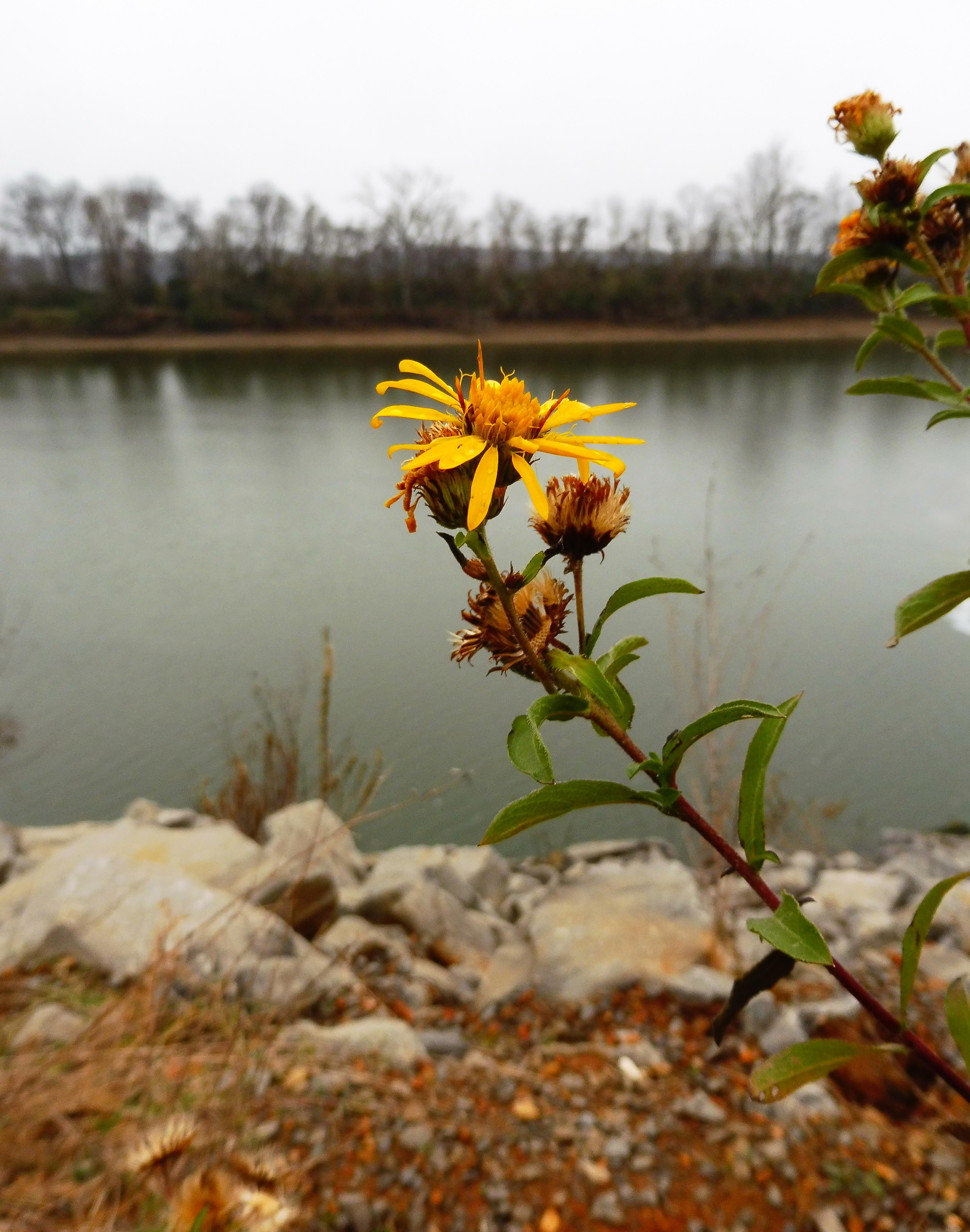

Conservation status
- Secure (NatureServe)

Scientific classification
- Kingdom: Plantae
- Clade: Tracheophytes
- Clade: Angiosperms
- Clade: Eudicots
- Clade: Asterids
- Order: Asterales
- Family: Asteraceae
- Genus: Heterotheca
- Species: H. camporum

Binomial name
- Heterotheca camporum (Greene) Shinners 1951

Synonyms
- Chrysopsis camporum Greene 1896; Chrysopsis villosa var. camporum (Greene) Cronquist; Heterotheca villosa var. camporum (Greene) Wunderlin

= Heterotheca camporum =

Species of flowering plant

Heterotheca camporum, known by the common name lemonyellow false goldenaster, is a North American species of flowering plant in the family Asteraceae. It is found only in the central United States, primarily the Ozarks, the Cumberland Plateau, and the middle Mississippi Valley. There are reports of additional populations in the Northeast, the Southeast, and in the Great Lakes region, but these appear to be waifs or naturalizations.

Heterotheca camporum is a perennial herb growing 150 centimeters (5 feet) in height, spreading by means of underground rhizomes. There can be as many as 100 stems from one clone. Each stem can produce 1-24 flower heads in flat-topped arrays Each head contains 16–38 ray florets surrounding 23–66 tiny disc florets at the center.
