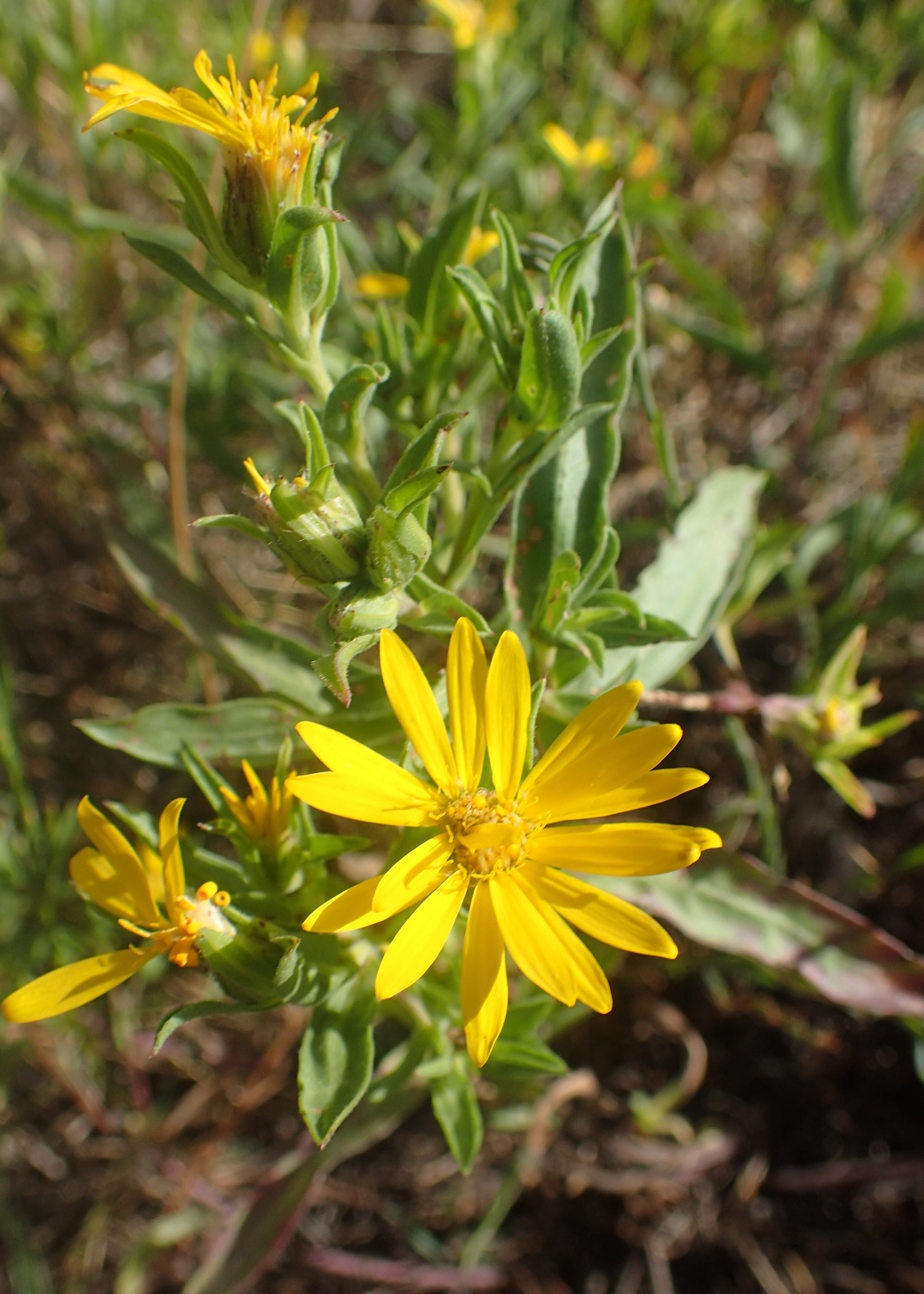
- In Kansas

Scientific classification
- Kingdom: Plantae
- Clade: Tracheophytes
- Clade: Angiosperms
- Clade: Eudicots
- Clade: Asterids
- Order: Asterales
- Family: Asteraceae
- Genus: Heterotheca
- Species: H. stenophylla

Binomial name
- Heterotheca stenophylla (A.Gray) Shinners 1951

Synonyms
- Chrysopsis hispida var. stenophylla A.Gray 1850; Chrysopsis stenophylla (A.Gray) Greene; Chrysopsis villosa var. stenophylla (A.Gray) A.Gray; Chrysopsis scabrifolia A.Nelson; Chrysopsis angustifolia Rydb.

= Heterotheca stenophylla =

Species of flowering plant

Heterotheca stenophylla, called the stiffleaf goldenaster, is a North American species of flowering plant in the family Asteraceae. It grows on the Great Plains of the central United States from South Dakota south to Texas and New Mexico.

Varieties

- Heterotheca stenophylla var. angustifolia (Rydb.) Semple
- Heterotheca stenophylla var. stenophylla
