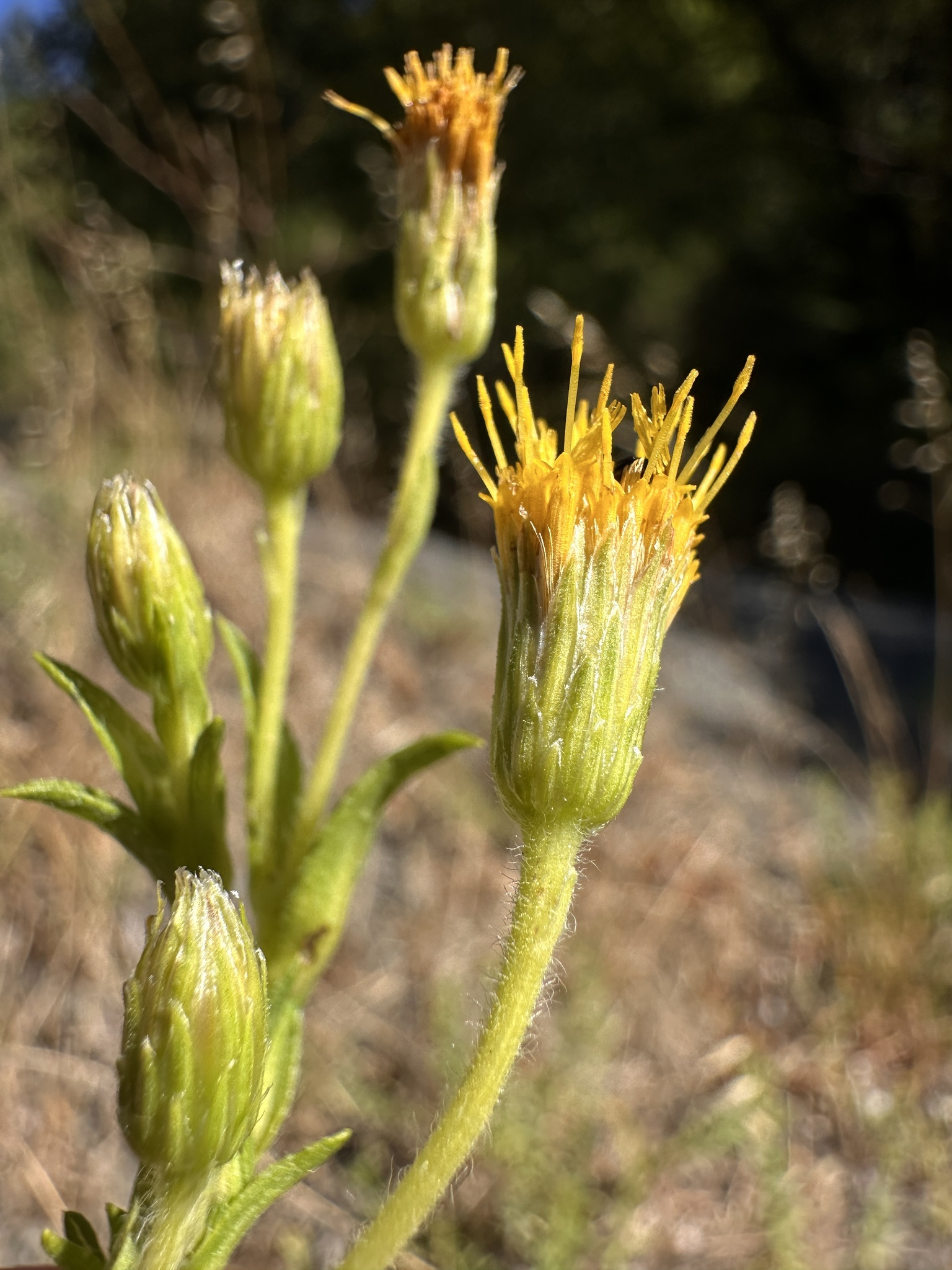

Conservation status
- Apparently Secure (NatureServe)

Scientific classification
- Kingdom: Plantae
- Clade: Tracheophytes
- Clade: Angiosperms
- Clade: Eudicots
- Clade: Asterids
- Order: Asterales
- Family: Asteraceae
- Genus: Heterotheca
- Species: H. oregona

Binomial name
- Heterotheca oregona (Nutt.) Shinners 1951

Synonyms
- Ammodia oregona Nutt. 1841; Chrysopsis oregona (Nutt.) A.Gray; Chrysopsis rudis (ex Greene) Greene, syn of var., rudis

= Heterotheca oregona =

Species of flowering plant

Heterotheca oregona is a species of flowering plant in the family Asteraceae known by the common names Oregon false goldenaster or rayless false goldenaster. It is native to Washington, Oregon, and California as far south as San Luis Obispo County.

== Description ==
Heterotheca oregona is found in gravelly or sandy soils, usually near streambanks, washes, and other alluvial habitats. This is a perennial herb which is variable in appearance, with four somewhat indistinct varieties. It reaches a maximum height of 20 centimeters (8 inches) to one meter (40 inches), and is covered in small bristles. The inflorescence contains 1-15 flower heads in a flat-topped array. Each head has 14-60 yellowish disc florets but no ray florets. The fruit is an achene with a long grayish pappus.

Varieties

- Heterotheca oregona var. compacta (D.D.Keck) Semple from Monterey County to Siskiyou County
- Heterotheca oregona var. oregona - Washington, Oregon, California as far south as Monterey County
- Heterotheca oregona var. rudis (Greene) Semple - Oregon, California as far south as San Benito County and Amador County
- Heterotheca oregona var. scaberrima (A.Gray) Semple from Glenn County to San Luis Obispo County
