= Brickellia oreithales =

Scientific classification
- Kingdom: Plantae
- Clade: Tracheophytes
- Clade: Angiosperms
- Clade: Eudicots
- Clade: Asterids
- Order: Asterales
- Family: Asteraceae
- Genus: Brickellia
- Species: B. oreithales

Binomial name
- Brickellia oreithales (B.L.Rob.) Shinners

Synonyms
- Kuhnia oreithales B.L.Rob.; Kuhnia triplinervis S.F.Blake

Species of flowering plant

Brickellia oreithales is a Mexican species of flowering plants in the family Asteraceae. It is native to northern and western Mexico, states of Sonora, Chihuahua, Durango, Jalisco, and Zacatecas.

Brickellia oreithales is an herb up to 60 cm (24 inches) tall. The plant produces several small white or pale purple flower heads with disc florets but no ray florets.
