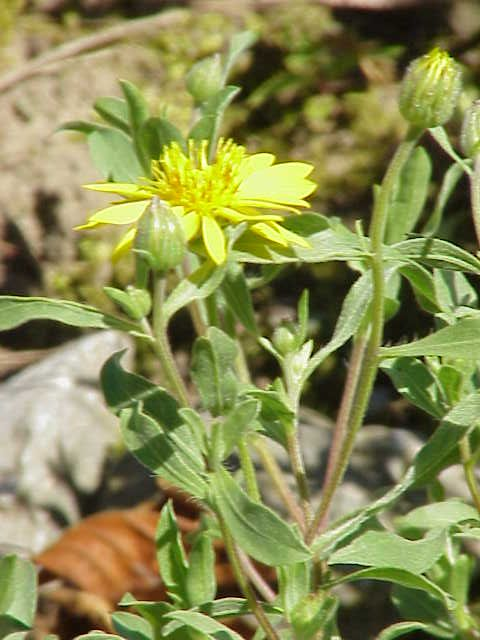

Conservation status
- Imperiled (NatureServe)

Scientific classification
- Kingdom: Plantae
- Clade: Tracheophytes
- Clade: Angiosperms
- Clade: Eudicots
- Clade: Asterids
- Order: Asterales
- Family: Asteraceae
- Genus: Heterotheca
- Species: H. rutteri

Binomial name
- Heterotheca rutteri (Rothr.) Shinners 1951

Synonyms
- Chrysopsis villosa var. rutteri Rothr. 1879; Chrysopsis rutteri (Rothr.) Greene; Chrysopsis foliosa var. sericeovillosissima A.Gray

= Heterotheca rutteri =

Species of flowering plant

Heterotheca rutteri, the Huachuca goldenaster or Rutter's false goldenaster, is a rare North American species of flowering plant in the family Asteraceae. It has been found only in the Huachuca and Santa Rita Mountains of southern Arizona and northern Sonora.
