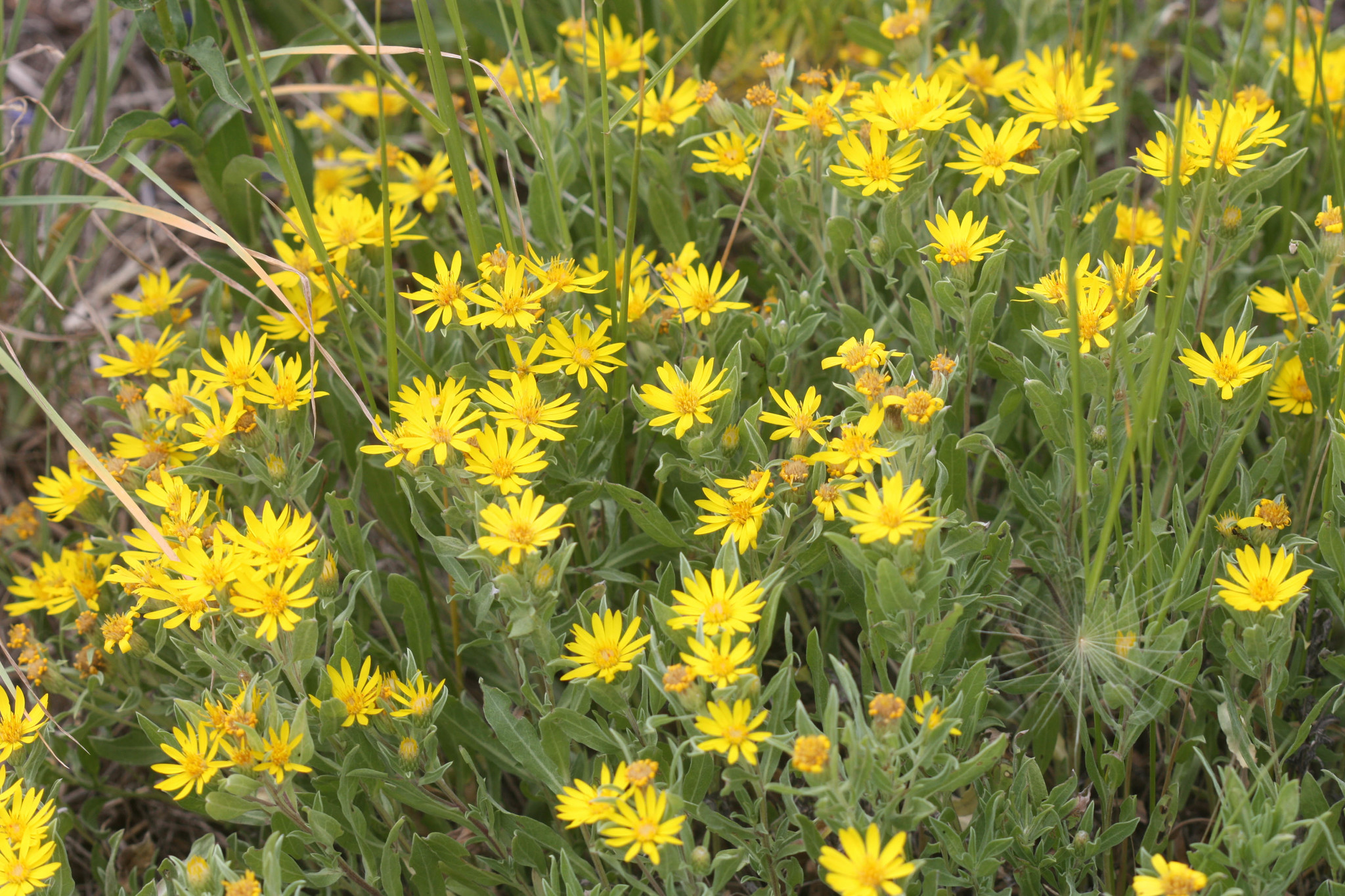
- Heterotheca hartmanii in Routt County, Colorado

Scientific classification
- Kingdom: Plantae
- Clade: Tracheophytes
- Clade: Angiosperms
- Clade: Eudicots
- Clade: Asterids
- Order: Asterales
- Family: Asteraceae
- Genus: Heterotheca
- Species: H. hartmanii

Binomial name
- Heterotheca hartmanii G.L.Nesom
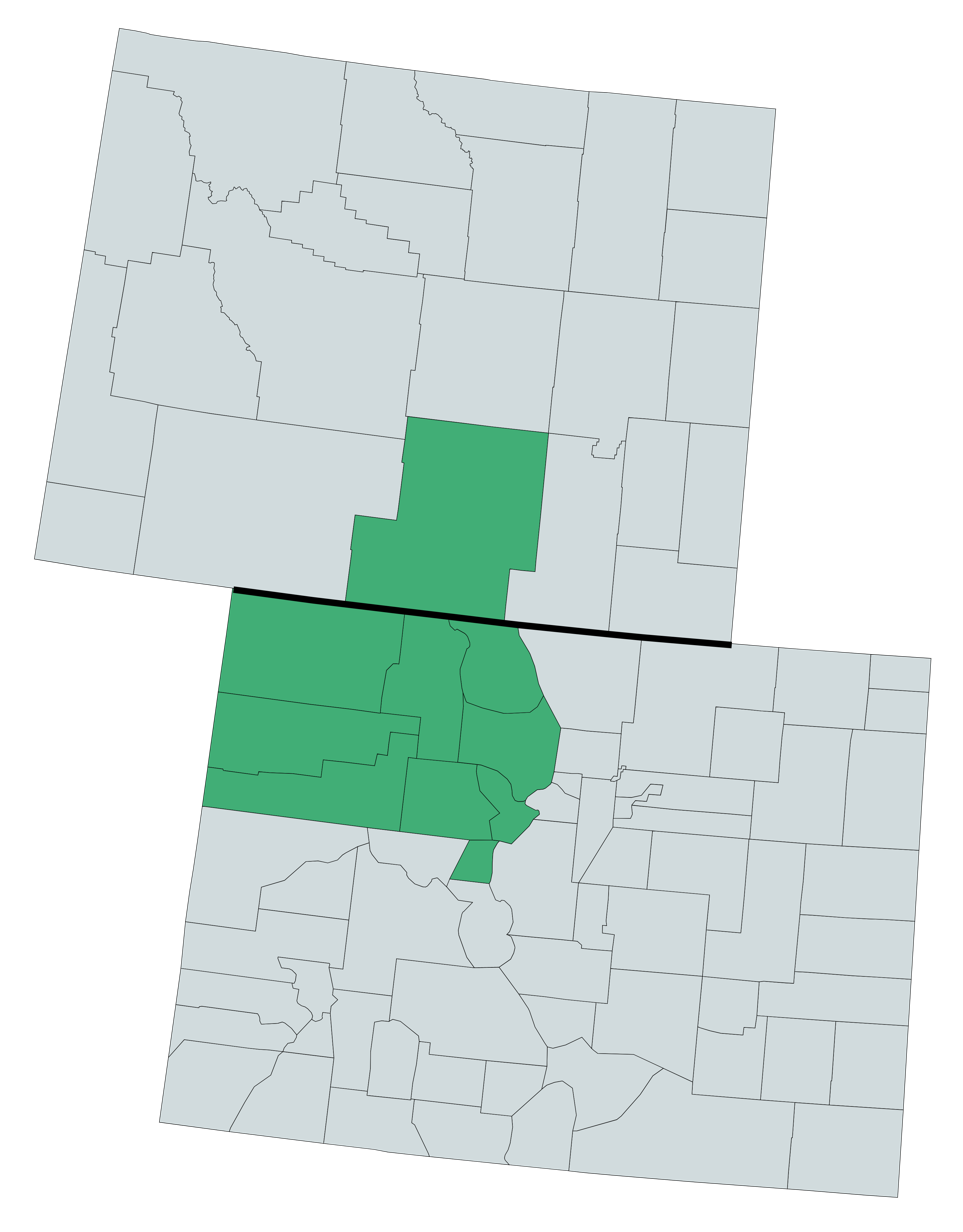
- Range of Heterotheca hartmanii in Wyoming and Colorado

= Heterotheca hartmanii =

Species of flowering plant

Heterotheca hartmanii is a species of goldenaster that was only scientifically described and named in 2020 and commonly called the aspen goldenaster or for its association with that biome. It mostly grows in northwest Colorado with a few occurrences in southwest Wyoming. It is very similar to Heterotheca pedunculata which grows in similar environments in the desert southwest of the United States.

== Description ==
Heterotheca hartmanii is a perennial herbaceous plant with a woody taproot. Individual plants grow stems that can be 12–45 centimeters long from a woody caudex, a hard structure at the top of the taproot that persists from year to year. The stems tend towards spreading outward slightly and then growing upward (ascending or, less commonly, spreading out somewhat more widely before growing upwards (spreading-ascending). The stems are covered (vestiture) in bristly hairs that press closely to the surface of the stem (strigose), though when the stems are more spreading they may be softer and erect (puberulent) and Guy L. Nesom speculates that this may be due to gene flow from Heterotheca hirsutissima. By the time it flowers all the basal leaves have withered and it only has leaves attached to its stems (cauline). The leaf shape is much longer than wide and with the widest portion near the tip a reverse lance point shape (oblanceolate) to being somewhat more boxy in shape, but still wider near the tip than at the base (oblong-oblanceolate) or more like an ellipse with rounded rather than boxy shape but still wider near the tip (elliptic-oblanceolate). The leaves are without distinct leaf stems except for the very largest leaves. The largest leaves are usually found midway up the stems and the leaves usually measure 15–45 millimeters long and 3–9 millimeters wide. Tufts of small leaves are often visible in the join between leaves and the stem (axillary) surfaces of the leaves are covered in arching hairs that are intermediate in texture between coarse and very fine (hirsute-villous) and both upper and lower sides of the leaves lack glands (eglandular).

== Taxonomy ==
The type specimen of this species was collected in 1988 by Nancy Kastning with Lee Huston, and Heather Kastning. It was misidentified as Heterotheca fulcrata and is currently housed in the Rocky Mountain Herbarium, University of Wyoming, Laramie. It was scientifically described as a new species by Guy L. Nesom in 2020 in a paper that described many new species in the genus. As of 2023 it listed as unchecked by World Flora Online (WFO), but as an accepted species by Plants of the World Online (POWO).

=== Names ===
The genus Heterotheca is named from Ancient Greek ἕτερος héteros "other, different" and θήκη thḗkē "case, chest". Its species name is in honor of the botanist Ronald L. Hartman, 1945 to 2018.

== Range ==
This plant is not widespread, only found in nine counties in Colorado: Moffat, Routt, Jackson, Rio Blanco, Garfield, Grand, Eagle, Summit, and Lake. The type specimen was collected in Carbon County, Wyoming, but it has not yet been reported growing in any other Wyoming counties.
