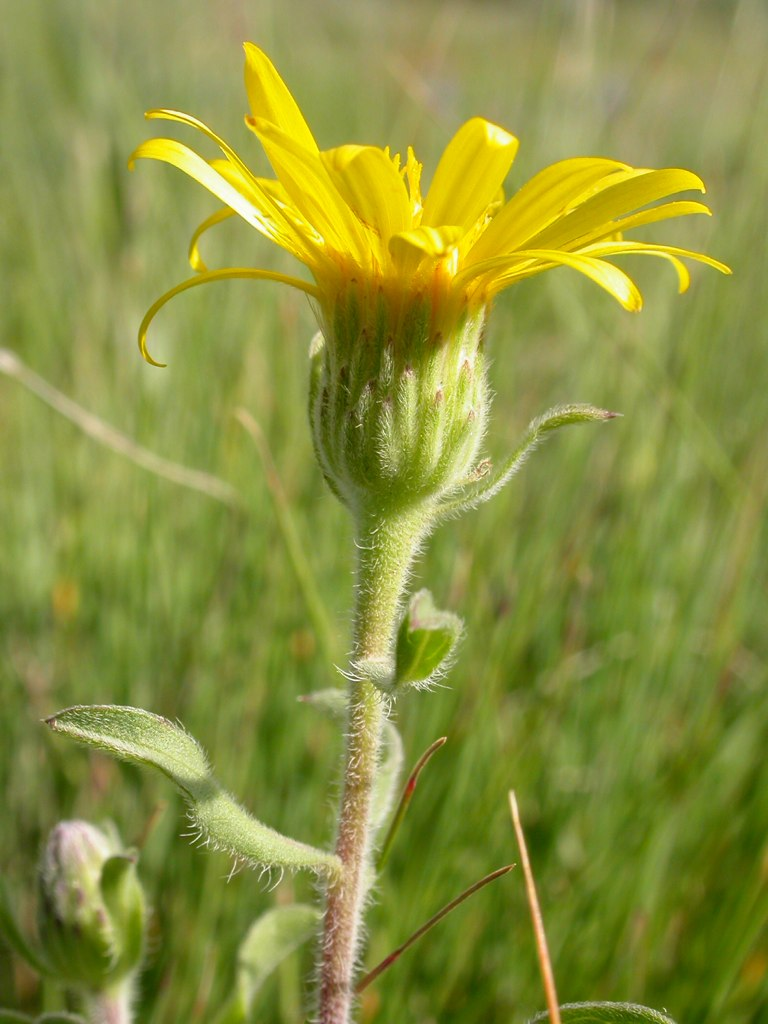

Conservation status
- Secure (NatureServe)

Scientific classification
- Kingdom: Plantae
- Clade: Tracheophytes
- Clade: Angiosperms
- Clade: Eudicots
- Clade: Asterids
- Order: Asterales
- Family: Asteraceae
- Genus: Heterotheca
- Species: H. villosa

Binomial name
- Heterotheca villosa (Pursh) Shinners 1951

Synonyms
- Synonymy: Amellus villosus Pursh; Aster gracilentus Banks ex DC.; Chrysopsis mollis Nutt.; Chrysopsis villosa (Pursh) Nutt. ex DC.; Diplogon falcatum (Pursh) Kuntze; Diplogon villosum (Pursh) Kuntze; Diplostephium hispidum Nees ex DC.; Inula villosa (Pursh) Nutt.; Sideranthus integrifolius Nutt.; Chrysopsis ballardii Rydb.; Chrysopsis depressa Rydb.; Heterotheca depressa (Rydb. ex Rydb.) Dorn; Chrysopsis butleri Rydb.; Chrysopsis foliosa Nutt.; Chrysopsis imbricata A.Nelson; Heterotheca foliosa (Nutt.) Shinners; Chrysopsis arida A.Nelson; Chrysopsis asprella Greene; Chrysopsis bakeri Greene; Chrysopsis columbiana Greene; Chrysopsis compacta Greene; Chrysopsis floribunda Greene; Chrysopsis grandis Rydb.; Chrysopsis hirsuta Greene; Chrysopsis hirsutissima Greene; Chrysopsis hispida (Hook.) DC.; Chrysopsis wisconsinensis (A.Gray); Heterotheca wisconsinensis (Shinners) Shinners; Chrysopsis horrida Rydb.; Heterotheca horrida (Rydb.) V.L.Harms; Chrysopsis pedunculata Greene

= Heterotheca villosa =

Species of flowering plant

Heterotheca villosa, commonly known as the hairy goldenaster, is a species of flowering plant in the family Asteraceae found in central and western North America.

== Description ==
Hairy golden aster can grow from 5 to 70 centimeters (2 to 28 in) tall, but is more typically 16 to 40 cm (6 to 16 in) tall. Their leaves may be as long as 60 cm (24 in), but are more often 22 to 40 cm (9 to 16 in) in length. Blooming from May to October, the flower head is about 2.5 cm (1 in) wide, with yellow ray and disk florets. The seeds have white bristles at the tip. The species can be difficult to identify, as it has a number of close relatives and many varieties.

Varieties

- Heterotheca villosa var. ballardii (Rydb.) Semple - northern Great Plains in US and Canada
- Heterotheca villosa var. depressa (Rydb.) Semple - Wyoming
- Heterotheca villosa var. foliosa (Nutt.) V.L.Harms - Rockies, Black Hills, northern Cascades, etc.
- Heterotheca villosa var. minor (Hook.) Semple - Rockies, Cascades, Sierra Nevada, etc.
- Heterotheca villosa var. nana (A.Gray) Semple - Rockies + other mountains from South Dakota to Arizona
- Heterotheca villosa var. pedunculata (Greene) V.L.Harms ex Semple - Arizona, New Mexico, Colorado, Utah
- Heterotheca villosa var. scabra (Eastw.) Semple - Mexico, southwestern USA
- Heterotheca villosa var. sierrablancensis Semple - New Mexico
- Heterotheca villosa var. villosa - northern Great Plains, Columbia Plateau, etc.

== Distribution and habitat ==
The species is widespread across central and western North America, from Ontario west to British Columbia and south as far as Illinois, Kansas, Nuevo León, Guanajuato, and northern Baja California. It grows well on dry lands, but also on plains, rocky slopes and cliffs, at low elevations and in coniferous forests.

== Cultivation ==
The wildflower gardener Claude A. Barr regarded it as a useful plant in the garden for its masses of bright yellow flowers.
