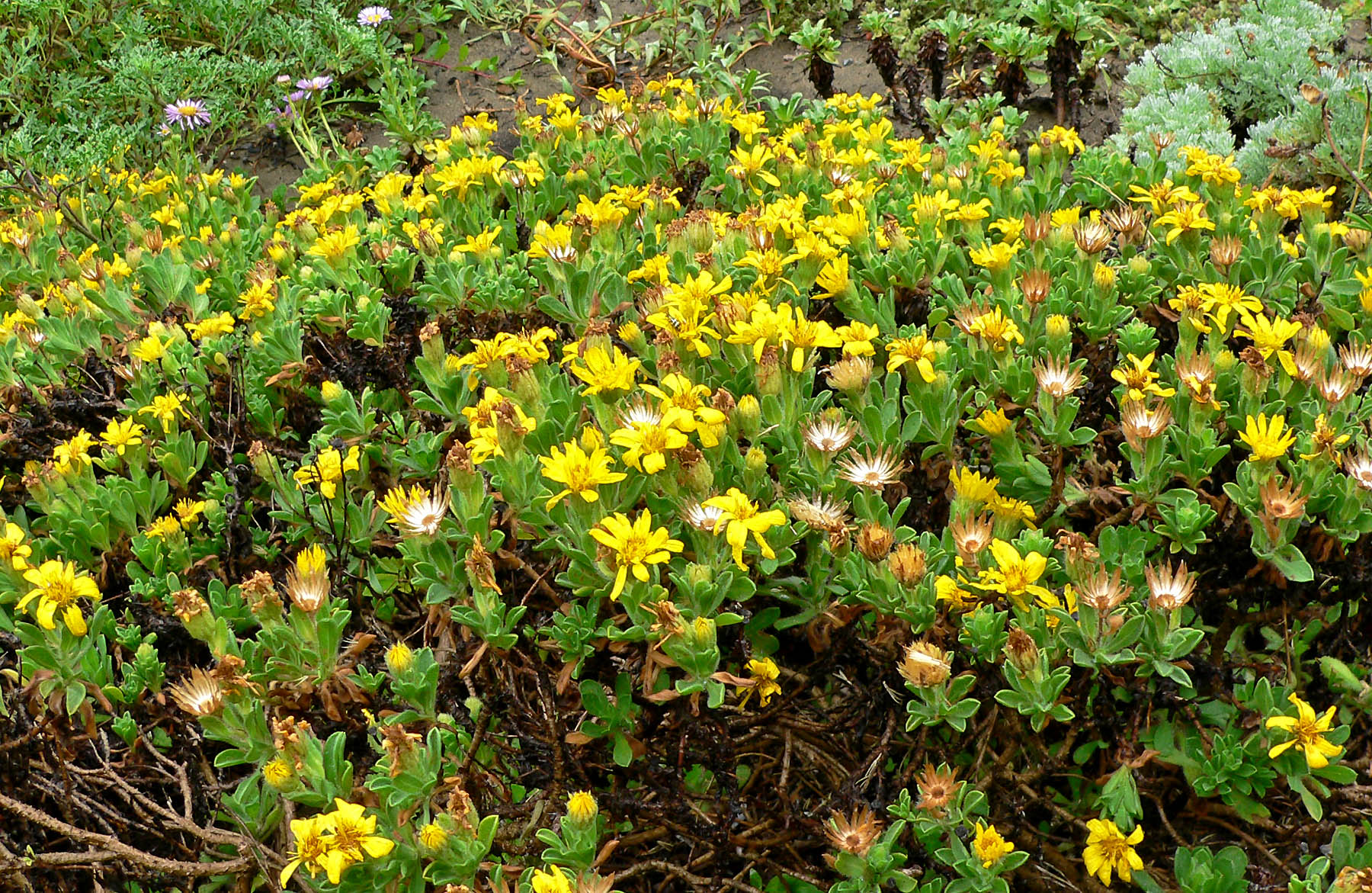
- Heterotheca sessiliflora subsp. bolanderi

Conservation status
- Apparently Secure (NatureServe)

Scientific classification
- Kingdom: Plantae
- Clade: Tracheophytes
- Clade: Angiosperms
- Clade: Eudicots
- Clade: Asterids
- Order: Asterales
- Family: Asteraceae
- Genus: Heterotheca
- Species: H. sessiliflora

Binomial name
- Heterotheca sessiliflora (Nutt.) Shinners 1951

Synonyms
- Synonymy: Chrysopsis sessiliflora Nutt.; Chrysopsis villosa var. sessiliflora (Nutt.) A. Gray; Chrysopsis arenaria Elmer, syn of subsp. bolanderi; Chrysopsis bolanderi A.Gray, syn of subsp. bolanderi; Heterotheca bolanderi (A.Gray) V.L.Harms, syn of subsp. bolanderi; Chrysopsis californica Elmer, syn of subsp. echioides; Chrysopsis camphorata Eastw., syn of subsp. echioides; Chrysopsis echioides Benth., syn of subsp. echioides; Chrysopsis vestita Greene, syn of subsp. echioides; Heterotheca camphorata (Eastw.) Semple, syn of subsp. echioides; Heterotheca echioides (Benth.) Shinners, syn of subsp. echioides; Chrysopsis fastigiata Greene, syn of subsp. fastigiata; Haplopappus thiniicola Rzed. & E.Ezcurra, syn of subsp. thiniicola; Heterotheca thiniicola B.L.Turner, syn of subsp. thiniicola

= Heterotheca sessiliflora =

Species of flowering plant

Heterotheca sessiliflora is a species of flowering plant in the family Asteraceae known by the common name sessileflower false goldenaster. It is native to California, Sonora, and Baja California.

Heterotheca sessiliflora grows in many types of habitats. It is a perennial herb which is quite variable in appearance, particularly across its four subspecies. It may be a small clumping or mat-forming plant or grow tall stems to heights exceeding a meter. It is coated in small bristles or long woolly hairs and it is glandular, particularly around the inflorescence. The flower head contains long yellowish disc florets and the edge is fringed with yellow ray florets.

Subspecies + varieties

- Heterotheca sessiliflora subsp. bolanderi (A.Gray) Semple San Francisco Bay area + coast of Redwood Country
- Heterotheca sessiliflora subsp. echioides (Benth.) Semple - from San Diego County to Sonoma County
- Heterotheca sessiliflora subsp. fastigiata (Greene) Semple - mountains of southern California
- Heterotheca sessiliflora var. sessiliflora
- Heterotheca sessiliflora subsp. sessiliflora - from Baja California north as far as Santa Clara County
- Heterotheca sessiliflora var. thiniicola (Rzed. & C.Ezcurra) G.L.Nesom - Gran Desierto de Alta northwestern Sonora
