= Heterotheca gypsophila =

Scientific classification
- Kingdom: Plantae
- Clade: Tracheophytes
- Clade: Angiosperms
- Clade: Eudicots
- Clade: Asterids
- Order: Asterales
- Family: Asteraceae
- Genus: Heterotheca
- Species: H. gypsophila

Binomial name
- Heterotheca gypsophila B.L.Turner 1984

Species of plant

Heterotheca gypsophila is a rare Mexican species of flowering plant in the family Asteraceae. It has been found only in a small region in the state of Nuevo León in northeastern Mexico.
