= Heterotheca monarchensis =

Conservation status
- Critically Imperiled (NatureServe)

Scientific classification
- Kingdom: Plantae
- Clade: Embryophytes
- Clade: Tracheophytes
- Clade: Spermatophytes
- Clade: Angiosperms
- Clade: Eudicots
- Clade: Asterids
- Order: Asterales
- Family: Asteraceae
- Genus: Heterotheca
- Species: H. monarchensis

Binomial name
- Heterotheca monarchensis D.A.York, Shevock & Semple

Species of plant

Heterotheca monarchensis is a rare species of flowering plant in the family Asteraceae known by the common names monarch goldenaster and sequoia false goldenaster. It is endemic to Fresno County, California, where it is known from only one location near Boyden Cave in the Kings River Canyon. It grows in the limestone cliffs of this Sierra Nevada river canyon, along with a few other rare local endemics. The plant was discovered in July, 1995, and described to science as a new species in 1996.

This is a perennial herb anchored in the rocky substrate by a taproot and producing one to many erect, spreading stems up to about 18 centimeters tall. The leaves have lance-shaped or oval blades which are densely hairy and bristly in texture, with some resin glands. They measure up to 2.5 centimeters long by a few millimeters in width and do not become much smaller toward the ends of the branches. The inflorescence contains one to five flower heads, each with up to 19 yellow ray florets measuring 1 to 1.5 centimeters in length. At the center are many hairy yellow disc florets.

There are approximately 500 individuals of this plant in existence. It is impacted by introduced plant species, especially red brome (Bromus madritensis subsp. rubens).
