= Tomentaurum niveum =

Scientific classification
- Kingdom: Plantae
- Clade: Embryophytes
- Clade: Tracheophytes
- Clade: Spermatophytes
- Clade: Angiosperms
- Clade: Eudicots
- Clade: Asterids
- Order: Asterales
- Family: Asteraceae
- Genus: Tomentaurum
- Species: T. niveum

Binomial name
- Tomentaurum niveum (S.Watson) G.L.Nesom

Synonyms
- Haplopappus niveus S.Watson; Chrysopsis nivea Greene

Species of plant

Tomentaurum niveum is a species of flowering plant in the family Asteraceae, native to the states of Sonora and Chihuahua in northern Mexico. It was first described by Sereno Watson in 1888 as Haplopappus niveus.
