= Tomentaurum vandevenderorum =

Scientific classification
- Kingdom: Plantae
- Clade: Tracheophytes
- Clade: Angiosperms
- Clade: Eudicots
- Clade: Asterids
- Order: Asterales
- Family: Asteraceae
- Genus: Tomentaurum
- Species: T. vandevenderorum

Binomial name
- Tomentaurum vandevenderorum (B.L.Turner) G.L.Nesom

Synonyms
- Heterotheca vandevenderorum B.L.Turner

Species of plant

Tomentaurum vandevenderorum is a species of flowering plant in the family Asteraceae, native to the state of Chihuahua in northern Mexico. It was first described by Billie Lee Turner in 1987 as Heterotheca vandevenderorum.
