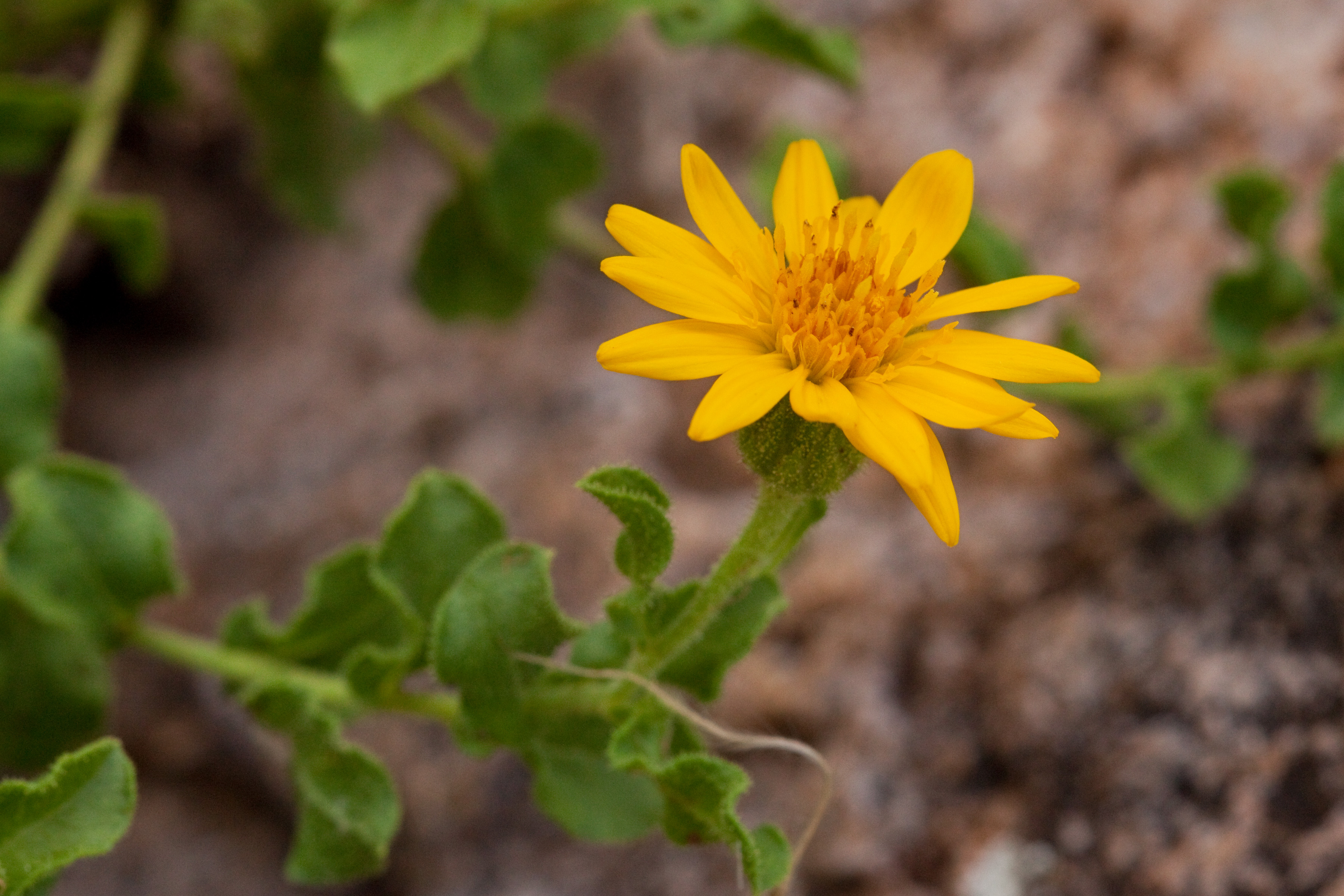
- In New Mexico

Scientific classification
- Kingdom: Plantae
- Clade: Tracheophytes
- Clade: Angiosperms
- Clade: Eudicots
- Clade: Asterids
- Order: Asterales
- Family: Asteraceae
- Genus: Heterotheca
- Species: H. viscida

Binomial name
- Heterotheca viscida (A.Gray) V.L.Harms 1968

Synonyms
- Synonymy: Chrysopsis villosa var. viscida A.Gray 1884; Chrysopsis viscida (A.Gray) Greene; Chrysopsis resinolens var. cil A.Nelson; Chrysopsis viscida var. ciliata (A.Nelson) S.F.Blake; Chrysopsis viscida var. cinerascens (S.F.Blake) S.F.Blake; Heterotheca horrida subsp. cinerascens S.F.Blake

= Heterotheca viscida =

Species of flowering plant

Heterotheca viscida, called the cliff goldenaster, is a North American species of flowering plant in the family Asteraceae. It grows on cliffs and ledges in mountainous regions. It grows in the southwestern United States, primarily in Arizona, New Mexico and southern Texas with reports of isolated populations in Nevada, southeastern Idaho, and southeastern Colorado.
