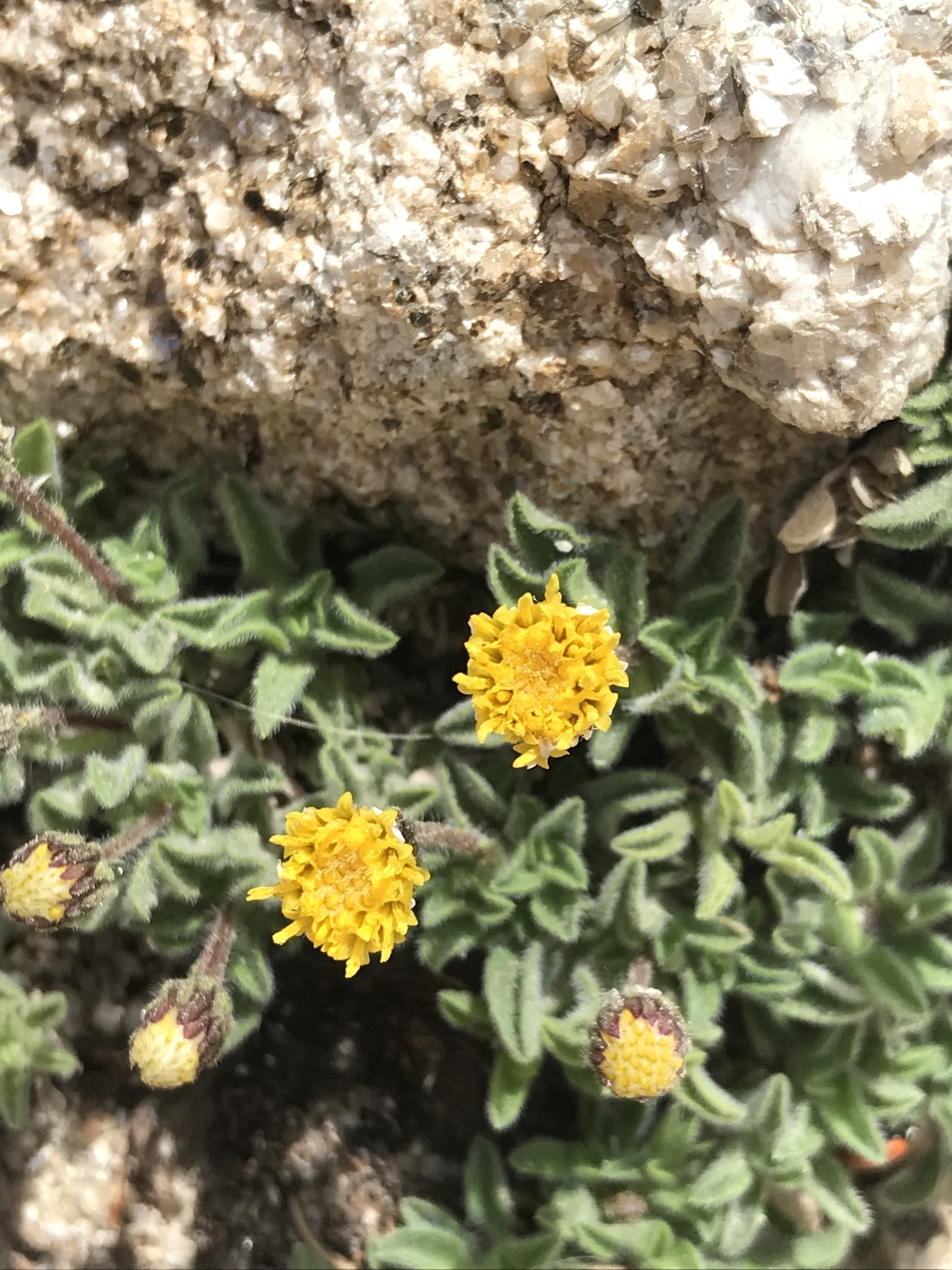

Scientific classification
- Kingdom: Plantae
- Clade: Tracheophytes
- Clade: Angiosperms
- Clade: Eudicots
- Clade: Asterids
- Order: Asterales
- Family: Asteraceae
- Genus: Heterotheca
- Species: H. brandegeei

Binomial name
- Heterotheca brandegeei (B.L.Rob. & Greenm.) Semple 1987

Synonyms
- Heterotheca brandegei (B.L.Rob. & Greenm.) Semple; Chrysopsis brandegeei B.L.Rob. & Greenm.; Chrysopsis brandegei B.L.Rob. & Greenm.; Heterotheca martirensis Moran

= Heterotheca brandegeei =

Species of plant

Heterotheca brandegeei is a rare Mexican species of flowering plant in the family Asteraceae.

The plant is endemic to Mexico, found only in the Sierra San Pedro Martir range in the state of Baja California, in the Baja California Norte region of the Baja California Peninsula. The Sierra San Pedro Martir is a mountain range in the Peninsular Ranges system of Southern California and the Baja California Peninsula.
