= Heterotheca marginata =

Scientific classification
- Kingdom: Plantae
- Clade: Tracheophytes
- Clade: Angiosperms
- Clade: Eudicots
- Clade: Asterids
- Order: Asterales
- Family: Asteraceae
- Genus: Heterotheca
- Species: H. marginata

Binomial name
- Heterotheca marginata Semple 1996

Species of plant

Heterotheca marginata, the Sonora false goldenaster, is a rare North American species of flowering plant in the family Asteraceae. It grows in Arizona in the southwestern United States. It has been found in only three counties in the south-central part of the state: Maricopa, Pinal, and Gila.
