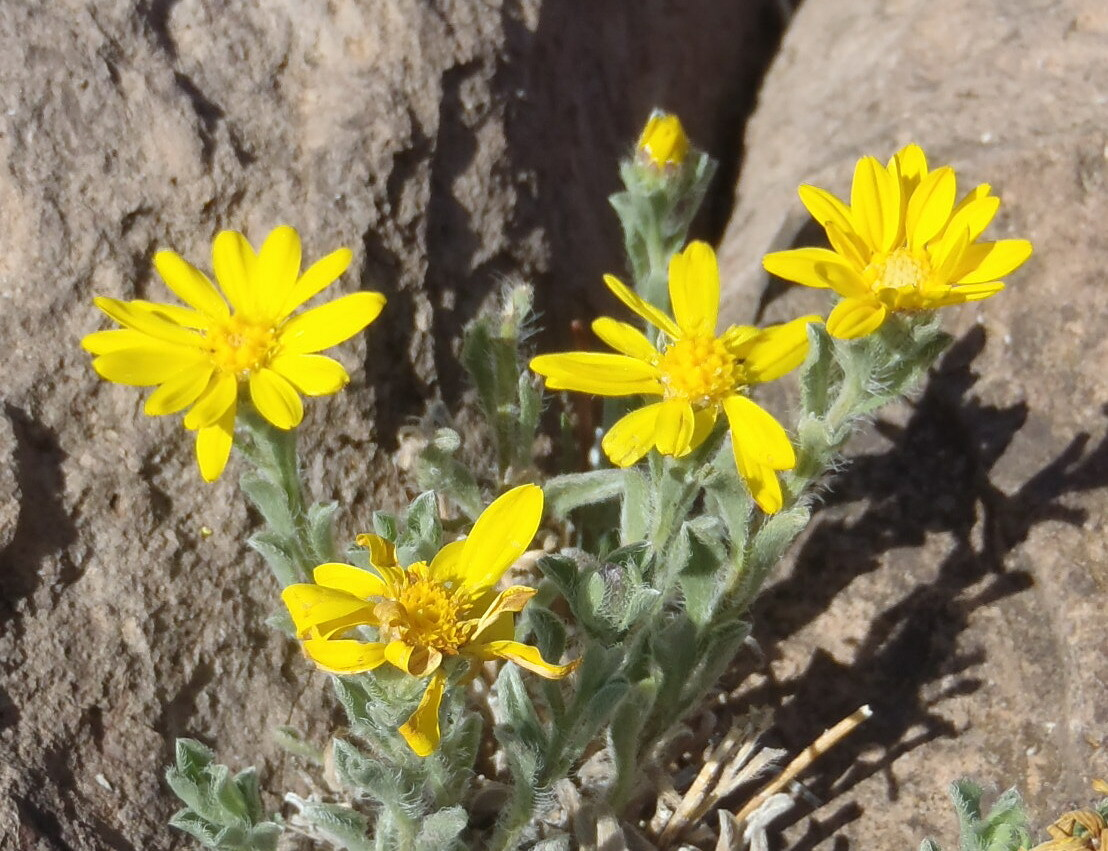

Scientific classification
- Kingdom: Plantae
- Clade: Tracheophytes
- Clade: Angiosperms
- Clade: Eudicots
- Clade: Asterids
- Order: Asterales
- Family: Asteraceae
- Genus: Heterotheca
- Species: H. fulcrata

Binomial name
- Heterotheca fulcrata (Greene) Shinners

Synonyms
- Chrysopsis fulcrata Greene 1898; Chrysopsis senilis Wooton & Standl.

= Heterotheca fulcrata =

Species of flowering plant

Heterotheca fulcrata, known by the common name rockyscree false goldenaster, is a North American species of flowering plant in the family Asteraceae. It has been found in northern Mexico (Sonora, Chihuahua, Coahuila, Nuevo León, Tamaulipas, Zacatecas) and in the western United States (from Arizona, New Mexico, western Texas north to Wyoming and Idaho).

Varieties

- Heterotheca fulcrata var. amplifolia (Rydberg) Semple - Wyoming, Colorado, Arizona, southwestern Utah, southern New Mexico
- Heterotheca fulcrata var. arizonica Semple - from Nevada to Coahuila
- Heterotheca fulcrata var. fulcrata - from Wyoming + Idaho south to Arizona and Tamaulipas
- Heterotheca fulcrata var. senilis (Wooton & Standley) Semple - southern Arizona, Southern New Mexico, western Texas, Sonora, Chihuahua, Coahuila
