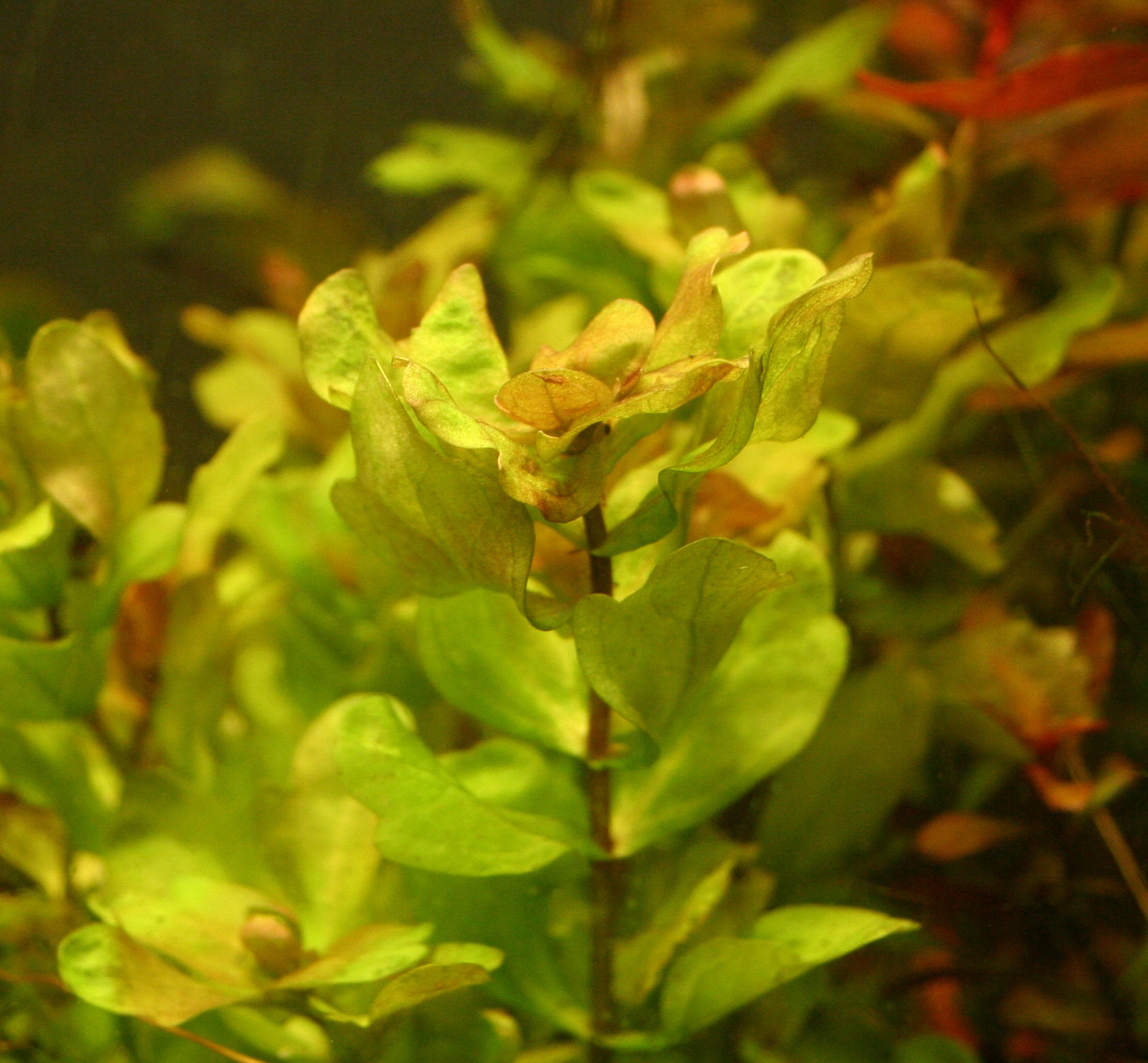

Scientific classification
- Kingdom: Plantae
- Clade: Embryophytes
- Clade: Tracheophytes
- Clade: Angiosperms
- Clade: Eudicots
- Clade: Asterids
- Order: Asterales
- Family: Asteraceae
- Subfamily: Asteroideae
- Tribe: Eupatorieae
- Genus: Shinnersia; R.M.King & H.Rob.
- Species: S. rivularis

Binomial name
- Shinnersia rivularis (A.Gray) R.M.King & H.Rob.

Synonyms
- Trichocoronis rivularis A.Gray

= Shinnersia =

Genus of aquatic plants

Shinnersia rivularis, known as the Rio Grande bugheal or Mexican oak leaf plant, is an aquatic plant native to Texas, Coahuila, and Nuevo León.

It is classified in tribe Eupatorieae within family Asteraceae. It is thought to be related to two other aquatic genera in this tribe, Sclerolepis and Trichocoronis. The roots live in the muck at the bottom of shallow slow-moving water (for example, along a stream), and the stem extends above the water slightly (less than 10 centimetres).

Shinnersia is a common freshwater aquarium plant, and can sometimes be found having escaped cultivation. The genus is named in honor of Lloyd H. Shinners of the Southern Methodist University.
