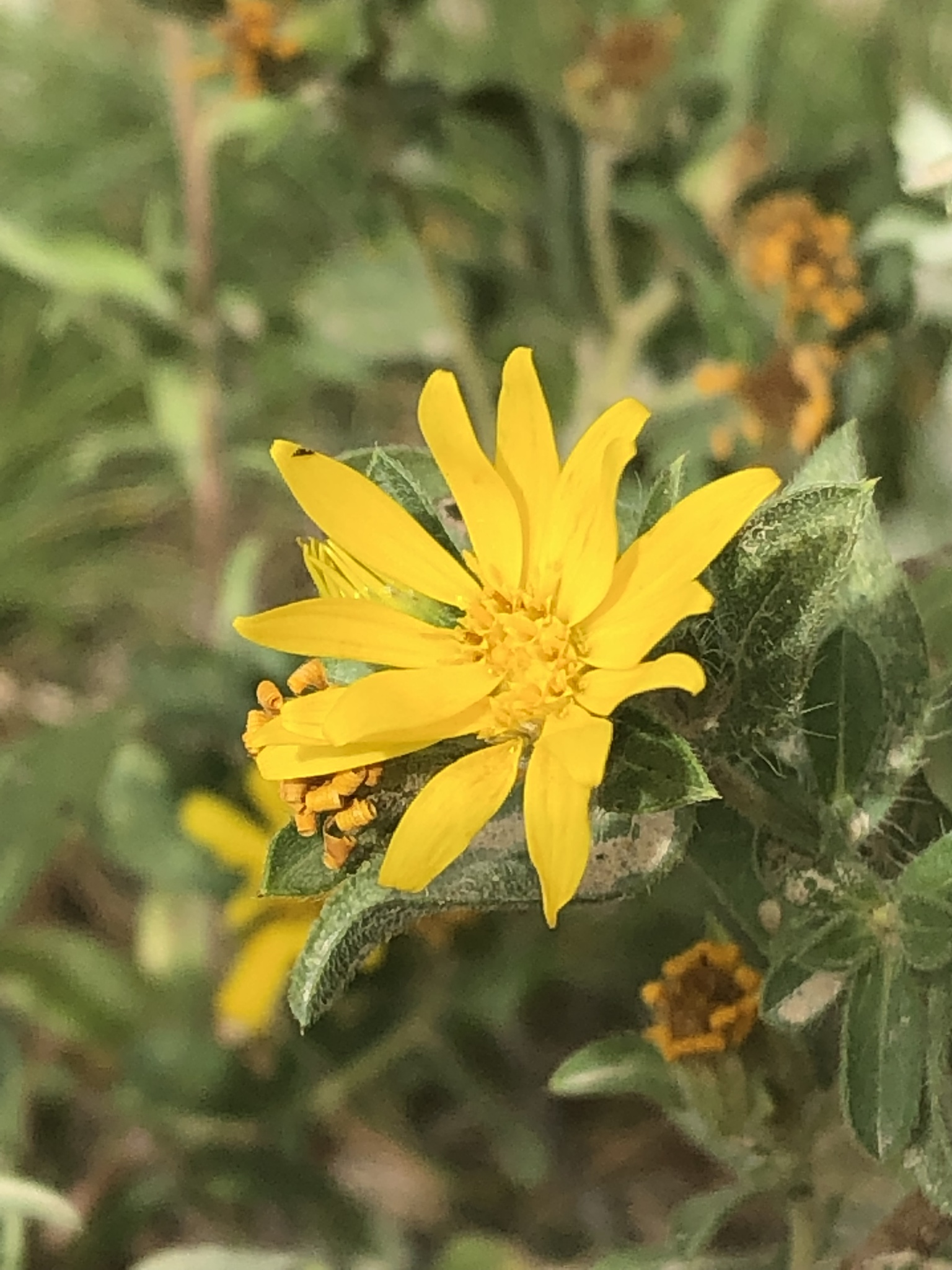

Scientific classification
- Kingdom: Plantae
- Clade: Tracheophytes
- Clade: Angiosperms
- Clade: Eudicots
- Clade: Asterids
- Order: Asterales
- Family: Asteraceae
- Genus: Heterotheca
- Species: H. hirsuta

Binomial name
- Heterotheca hirsuta (Greene) G.L.Nesom (Rydb.) Semple 1987

Synonyms
- List: Chrysopsis barbata Rydb.; Chrysopsis hirsuta Greene; Chrysopsis elata Osterh.; Chrysopsis resinolens var. ciliata A.Nelson; Chrysopsis viscida var. ciliata (A.Nelson) S.F.Blake; Heterotheca barbata (Rydb.) Semple

= Heterotheca hirsuta =

Species of plant

Heterotheca hirsuta, the Spokane false goldenaster, is a species of flowering plant in the family Asteraceae. It is found in the north-western United States, and western Canada.
