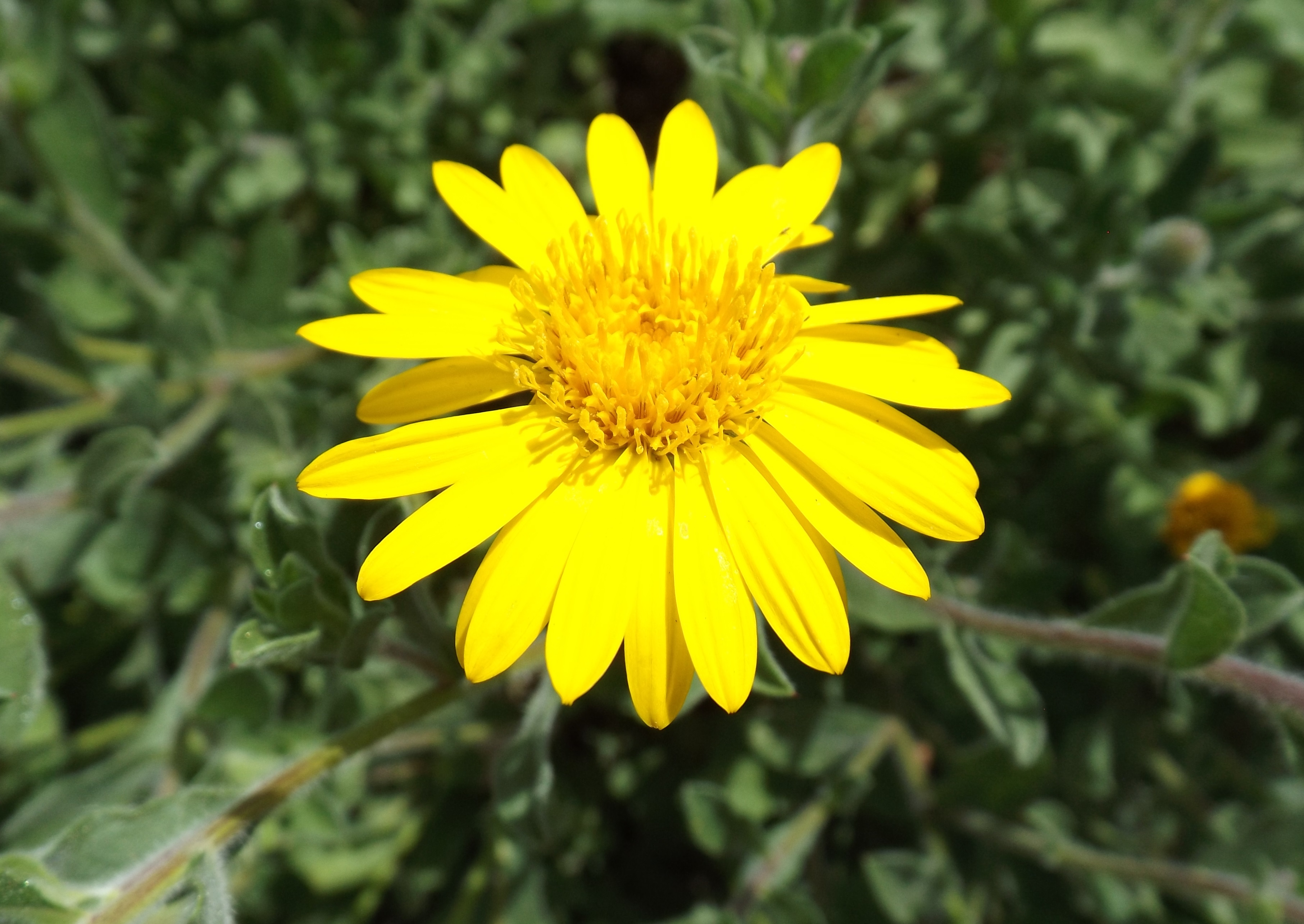

Scientific classification
- Kingdom: Plantae
- Clade: Tracheophytes
- Clade: Angiosperms
- Clade: Eudicots
- Clade: Asterids
- Order: Asterales
- Family: Asteraceae
- Genus: Heterotheca
- Species: H. mucronata

Binomial name
- Heterotheca mucronata Harms ex B.L.Turner 1984

= Heterotheca mucronata =

Species of flowering plant

Heterotheca mucronata is a species of flowering plant in the family Asteraceae. It is native to Mexico, where it has been found in Nuevo León, Tamaulipas, Coahuila, and northeastern Zacatecas.
