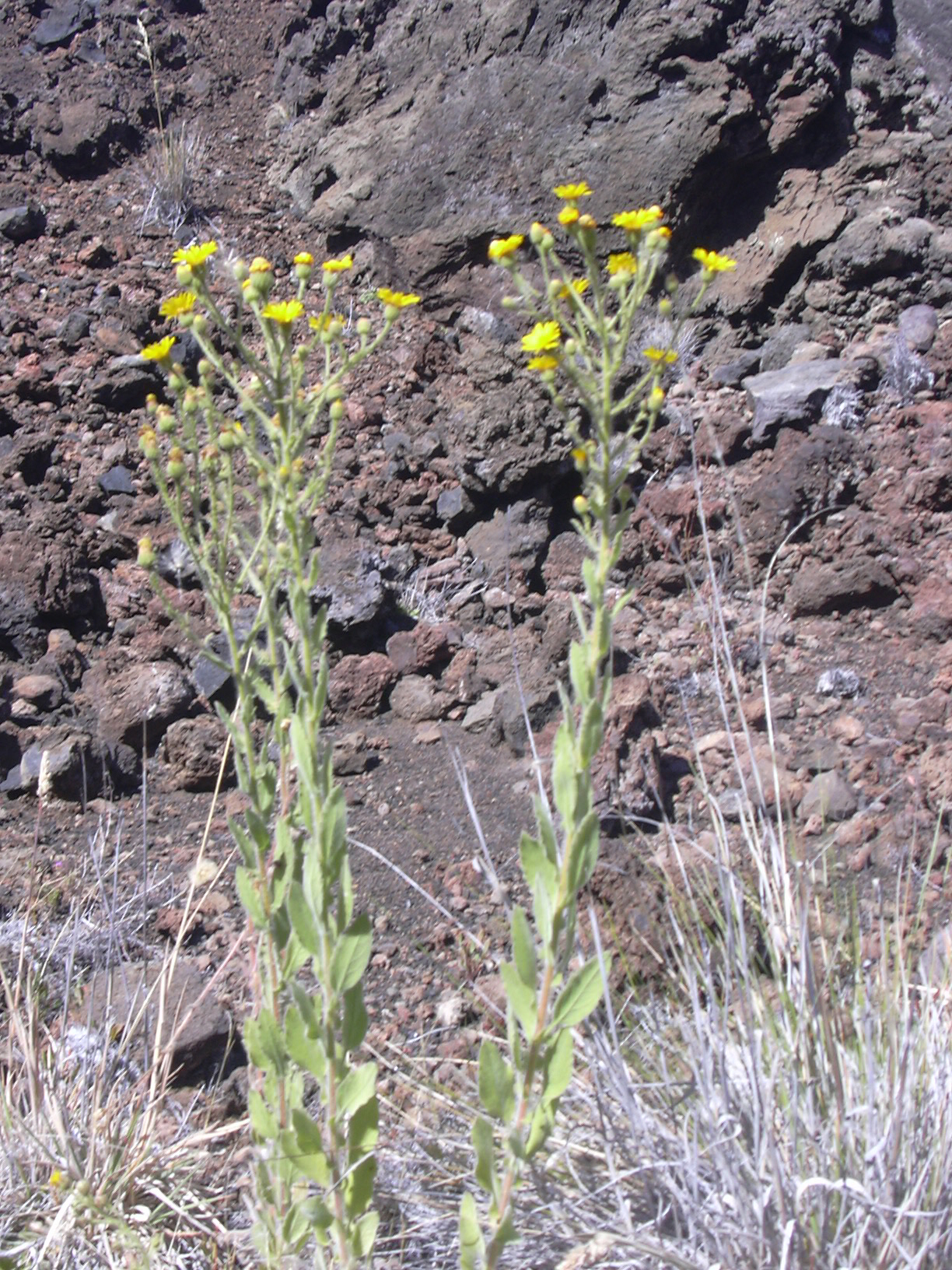

Conservation status
- Apparently Secure (NatureServe)

Scientific classification
- Kingdom: Plantae
- Clade: Tracheophytes
- Clade: Angiosperms
- Clade: Eudicots
- Clade: Asterids
- Order: Asterales
- Family: Asteraceae
- Genus: Heterotheca
- Species: H. grandiflora

Binomial name
- Heterotheca grandiflora Nutt. 1840

Synonyms
- Heterotheca floribunda Benth.

= Heterotheca grandiflora =

Species of plant

Heterotheca grandiflora is a species of flowering plant in the family Asteraceae known by the common name silk-grass goldenaster or telegraphweed. It is native to the southwestern United States (California, Nevada, Utah, Arizona) and northwestern Mexico (Baja California), but it can be found in other areas as an introduced species, such as Hawaii. It is often a roadside weed even where it is native.

Heterotheca grandiflora is a tall, bristly, glandular plant exceeding a meter (40 inches) in height and densely foliated in hairy to spiny toothed or lobed leaves. Leaves are smaller and more widely spaced toward the top of the stem, which is occupied by an inflorescence of bright yellow daisy-like flower heads. The disc and ray florets drop away to leave a spherical head of achenes, each with a long white pappus.

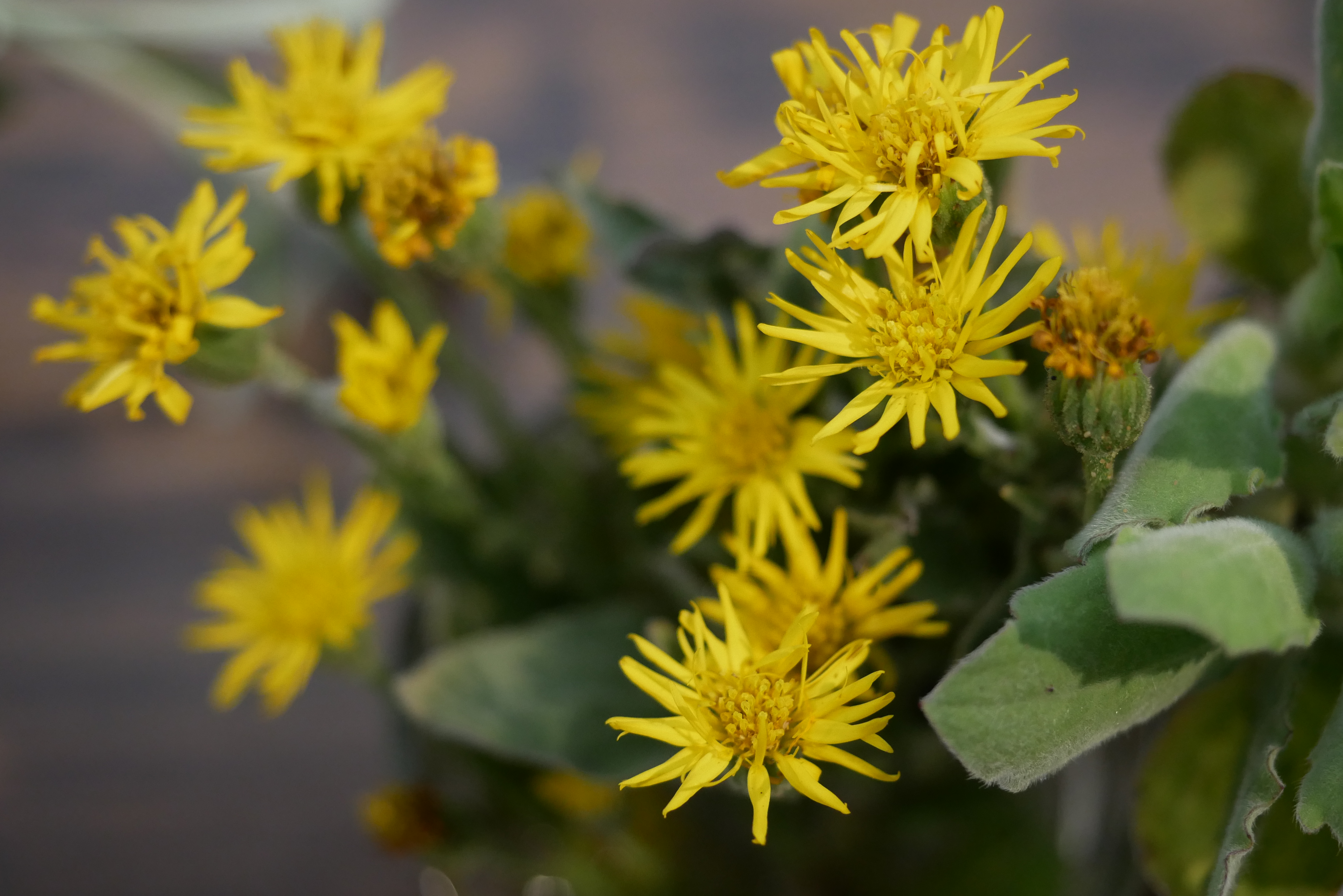
Heterotheca grandiflora

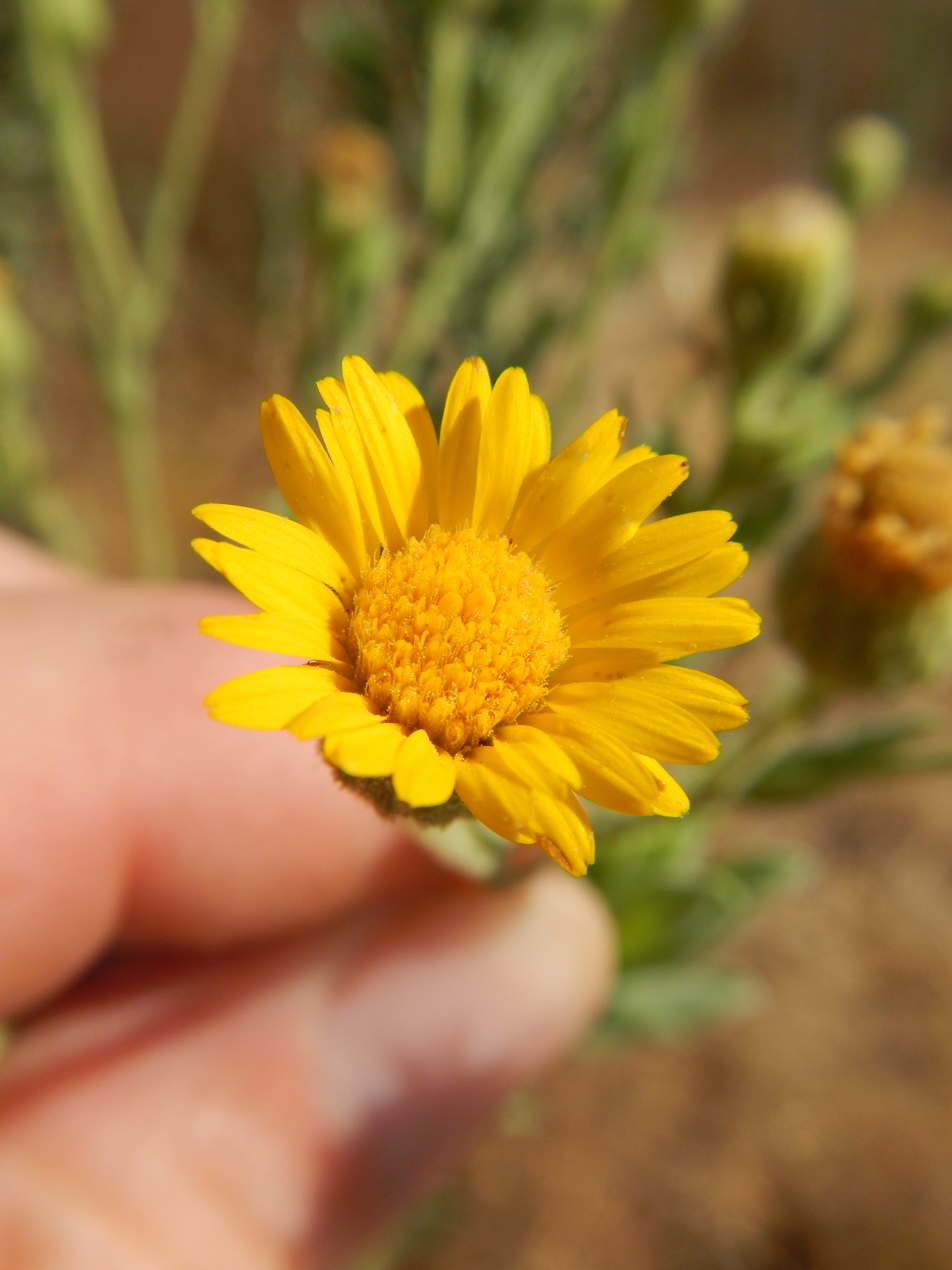
Closeup of flower

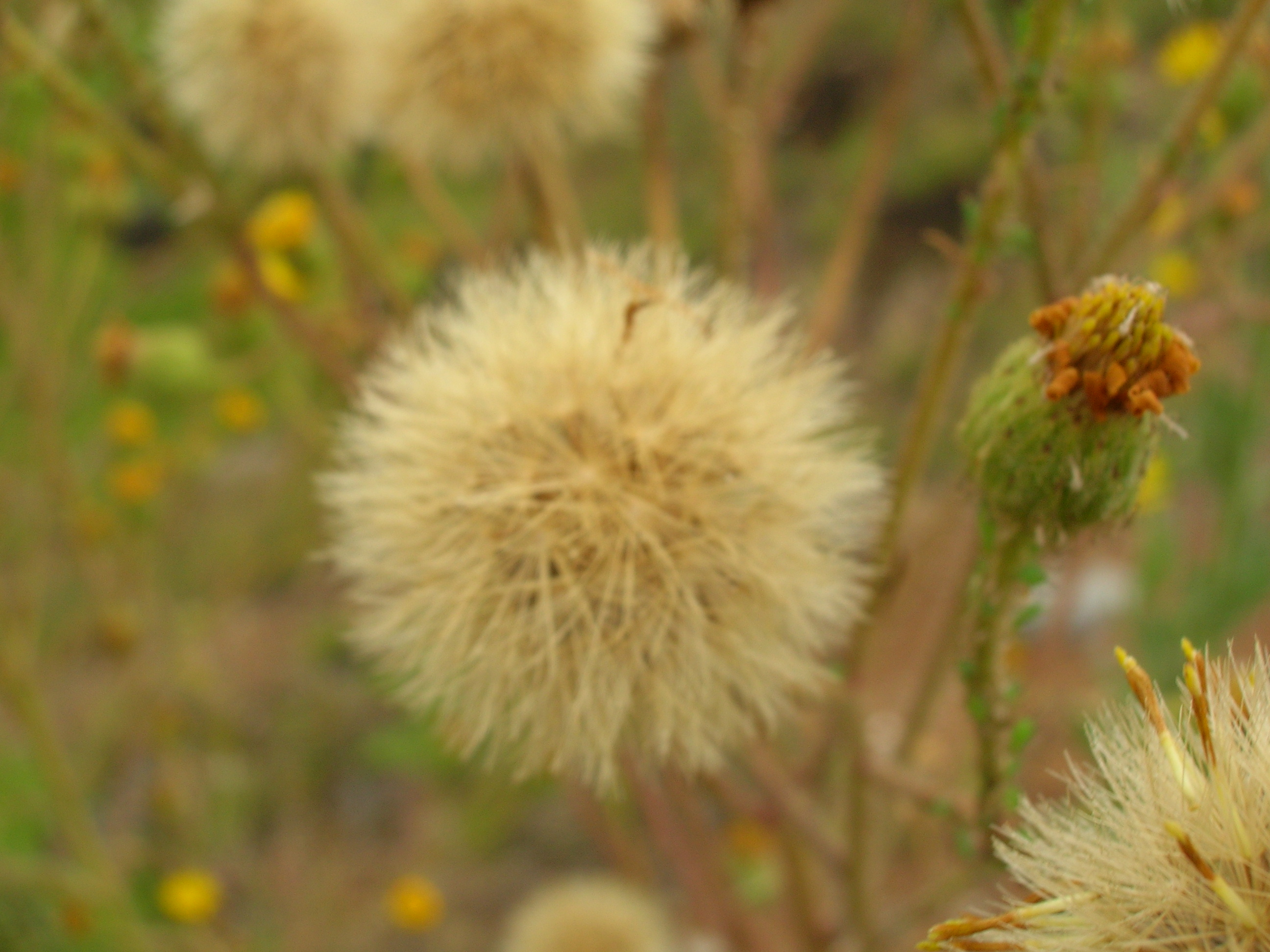
Closeup of flower gone to seed

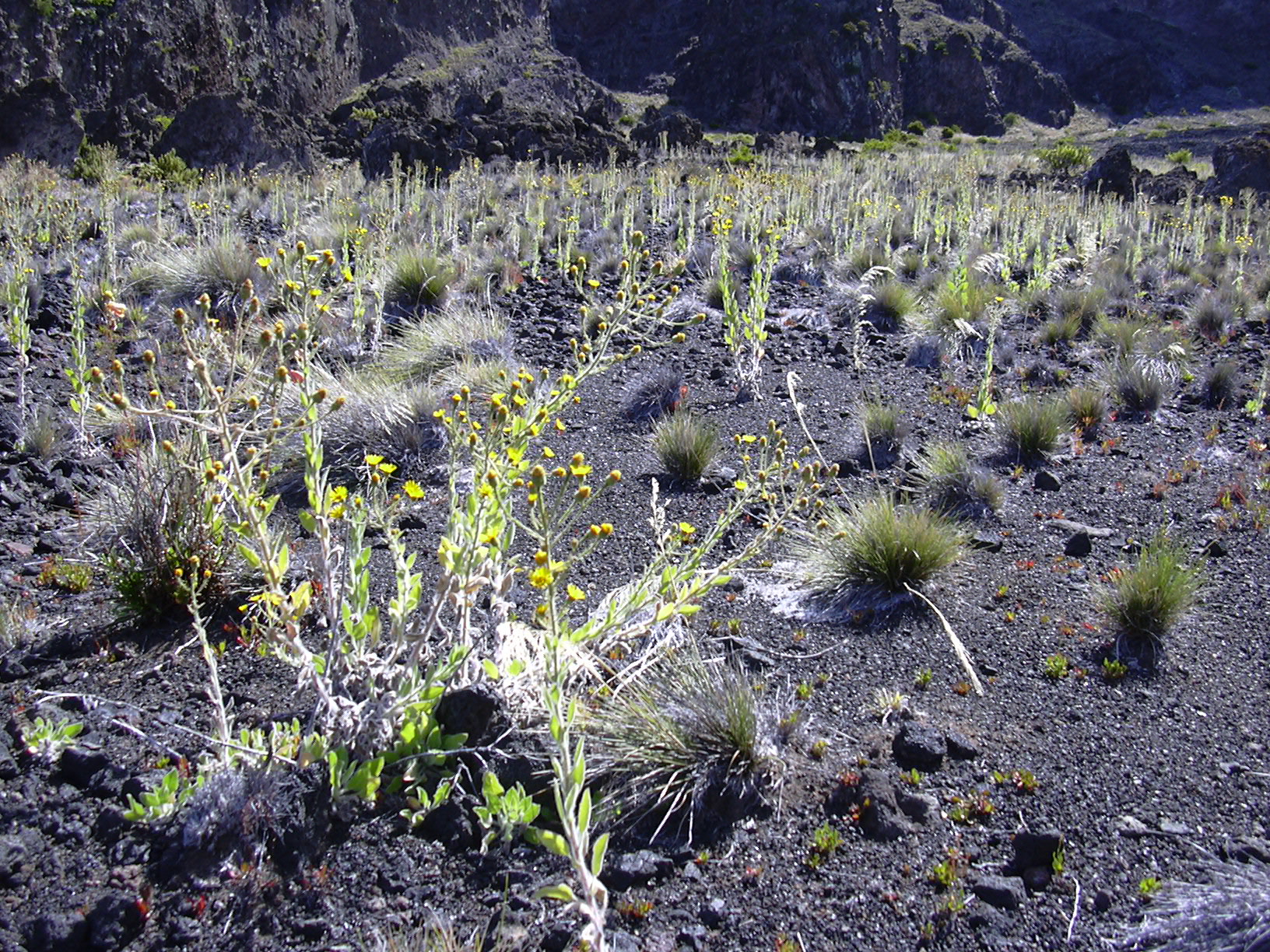
Field of Heterotheca grandiflora
