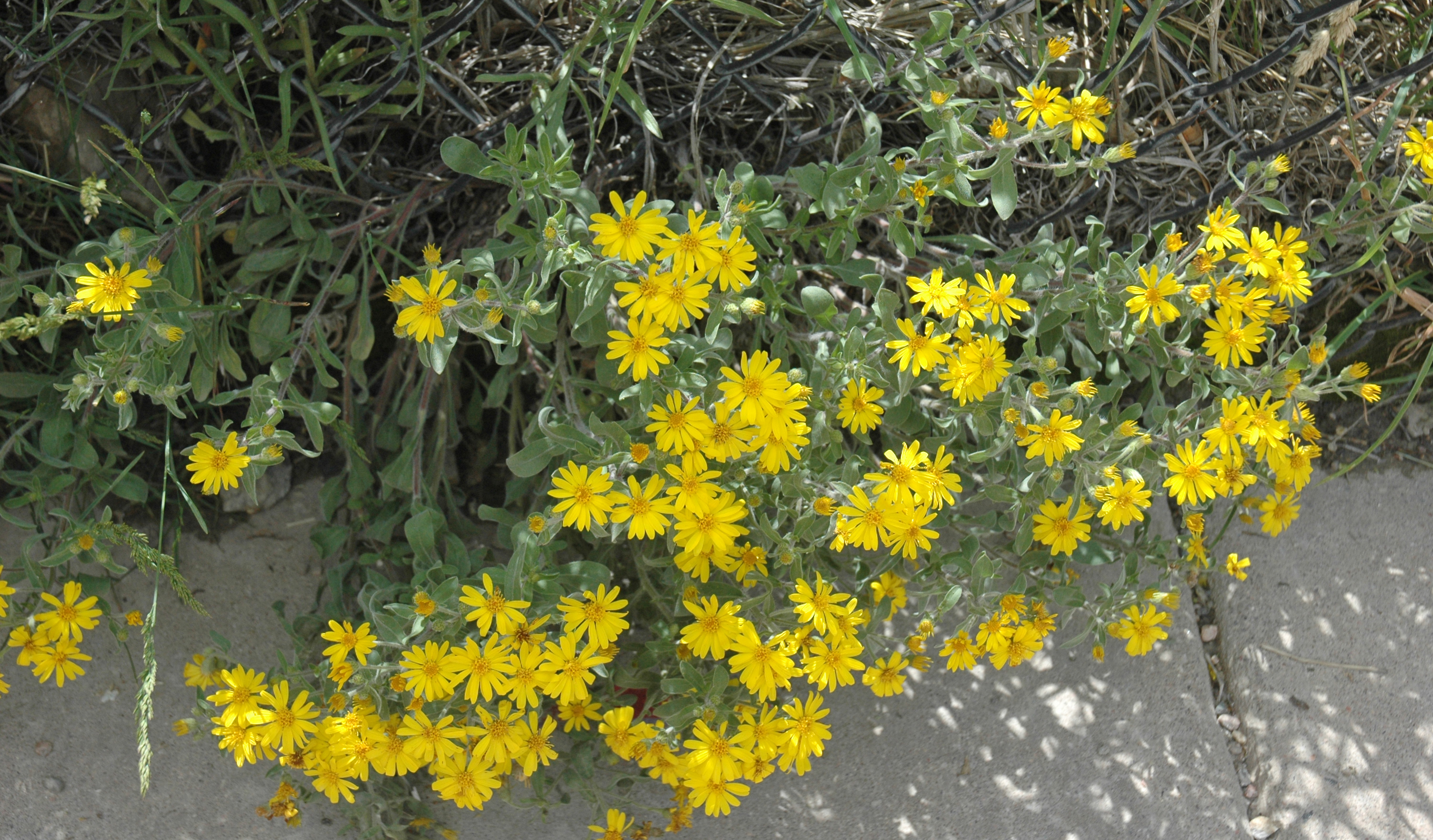

Conservation status
- Apparently Secure (NatureServe)

Scientific classification
- Kingdom: Plantae
- Clade: Tracheophytes
- Clade: Angiosperms
- Clade: Eudicots
- Clade: Asterids
- Order: Asterales
- Family: Asteraceae
- Genus: Heterotheca
- Species: H. pumila

Binomial name
- Heterotheca pumila (Greene) Semple 1987

Synonyms
- Chrysopsis pumila Greene 1894; Chrysopsis alpicola Rydb.; Chrysopsis alpicola var. glomerata A.Nelson; Chrysopsis cooperi A.Nelson; Chrysopsis villosa var. glomerata (A.Nelson) V.L.Harms

= Heterotheca pumila =

Species of flowering plant

Heterotheca pumila, the alpine goldenaster, is a North American species of flowering plant in the family Asteraceae. It grows in alpine and subalpine regions in the mountains of the western United States. It has been found the Rocky Mountains in Wyoming, Colorado, Utah, and New Mexico.

Typically, it typically grows up to about 15 inches tall, and blooms between July and September. Appearance-wise, it has multiple yellow flowers on top of a roundish mound of green-gray leaves. It is described to have a "strongly pungent" smell.
