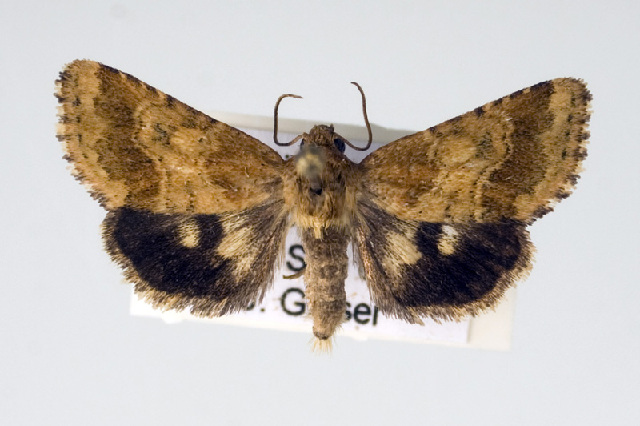

Scientific classification
- Domain: Eukaryota
- Kingdom: Animalia
- Phylum: Arthropoda
- Class: Insecta
- Order: Lepidoptera
- Superfamily: Noctuoidea
- Family: Noctuidae
- Genus: Schinia
- Species: S. nubila

Binomial name
- Schinia nubila Strecker, 1876

Synonyms
- Schinia dolosa Strecker, 1898; Schinia lora Strecker, 1898

= Schinia nubila =

Species of moth

Schinia nubila, the camphorweed flower moth or brown flower moth, is a moth of the family Noctuidae. The species was first described by Herman Strecker in 1876. It is found from the US states of Oklahoma to New Jersey, south to Florida and Texas. Its range is expanding in the northeast. Furthermore, recorded from Colorado, Kansas, Oklahoma, Arkansas, North Carolina, South Carolina and Maryland.

The wingspan is 22–24 mm. There is one generation per year.

Larvae have been recorded on Heterotheca subaxillaris and Solidago species.
