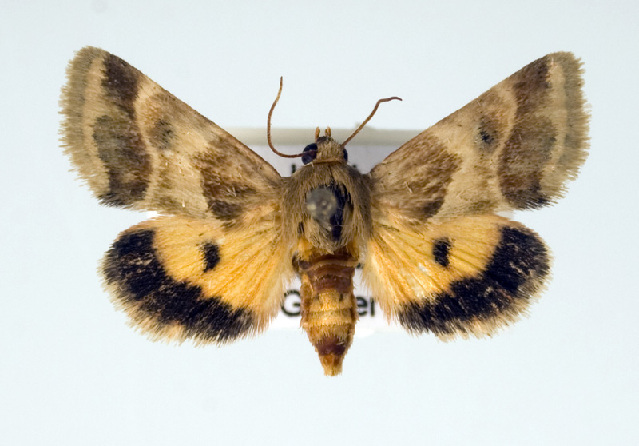

Scientific classification
- Kingdom: Animalia
- Phylum: Arthropoda
- Clade: Pancrustacea
- Class: Insecta
- Order: Lepidoptera
- Superfamily: Noctuoidea
- Family: Noctuidae
- Genus: Schinia
- Species: S. lynx

Binomial name
- Schinia lynx (Grote, 1881)

= Schinia lynx =

Species of moth

Schinia lynx, the lynx flower moth, is a moth of the family Noctuidae. The species was first described by Augustus Radcliffe Grote in 1881. It is found in North America from Wisconsin, southern Ontario, Quebec and Maine, south to Florida and Texas. Records include Colorado, Iowa, Kansas, Nebraska, New York, Maryland, Oklahoma and Oregon.

There is one generation per year. The Lynx Flower Moth relies on Daisy Fleabane for its life cycle.

The larvae feed on Erigeron and Heterotheca subaxillaris.
