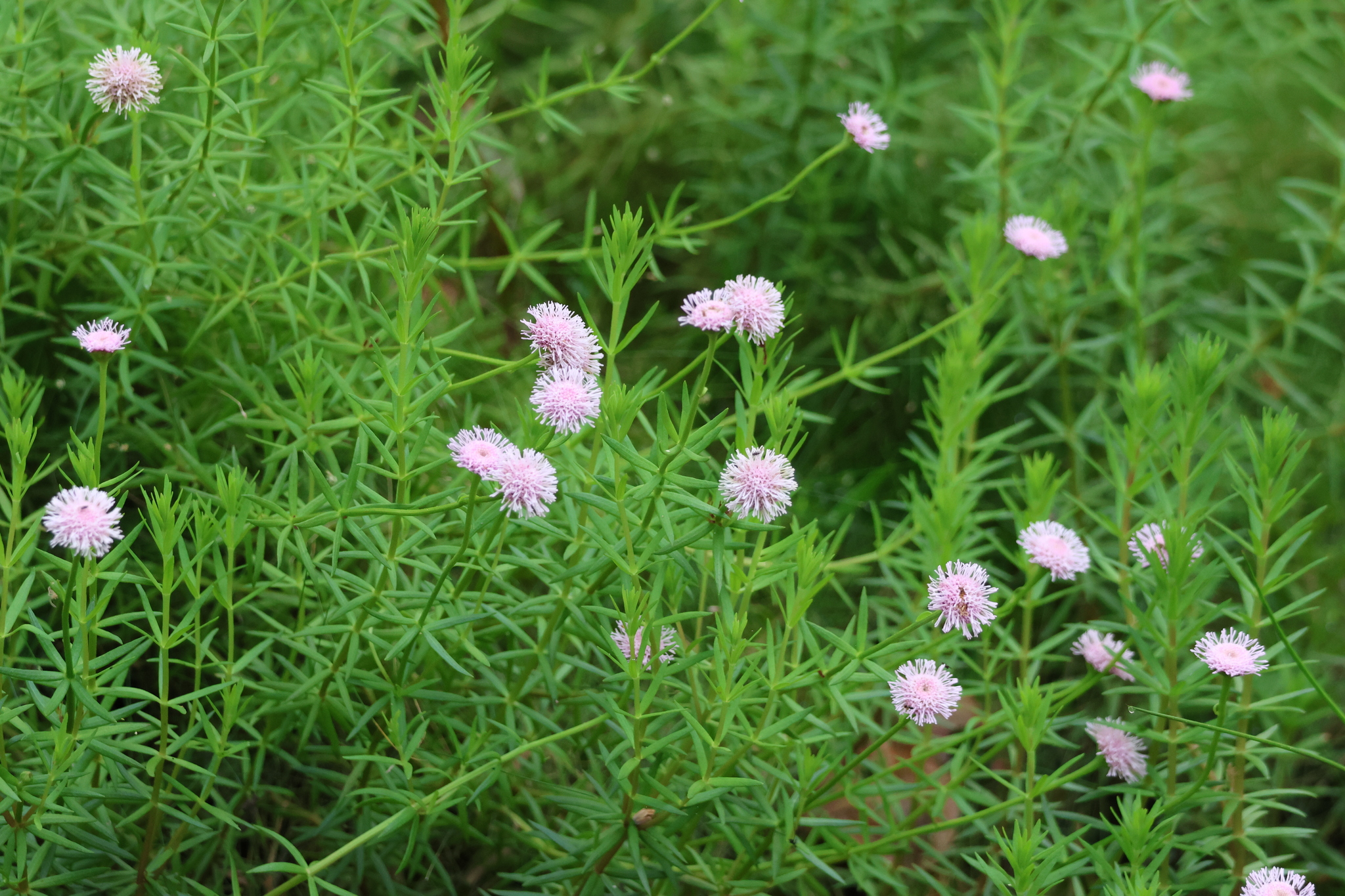
- Sclerolepis uniflora

Scientific classification
- Kingdom: Plantae
- Clade: Tracheophytes
- Clade: Angiosperms
- Clade: Eudicots
- Clade: Asterids
- Order: Asterales
- Family: Asteraceae
- Subfamily: Asteroideae
- Tribe: Eupatorieae
- Genus: Sclerolepis; Cass.
- Species: S. uniflora

Binomial name
- Sclerolepis uniflora (Walter) Britton, Sterns & Poggenb.

Synonyms
- Ethulia uniflora Walter

= Sclerolepis =

Genus of aquatic plants

Sclerolepis is an aquatic plant native to the eastern United States. It has only one known species, Sclerolepis uniflora, the pink bogbutton. It lives in ponds and other wet areas. When water is abundant, the plant lives underwater, with long stems and flaccid, elongated leaves, and does not flower. When the water level drops, it assumes a form more familiar in terrestrial plants, with an erect stem, and flowers in summer to fall. The flowers are pink.

Sclerolepis is fairly common in the southeastern United States, from Alabama and Florida to North Carolina, and has more sparse distribution as far north as New Hampshire.

== Classification ==
Sclerolepis is in the tribe Eupatorieae of the family Asteraceae. It is thought to be related to two other aquatic genera in this tribe, Shinnersia and Trichocoronis.
