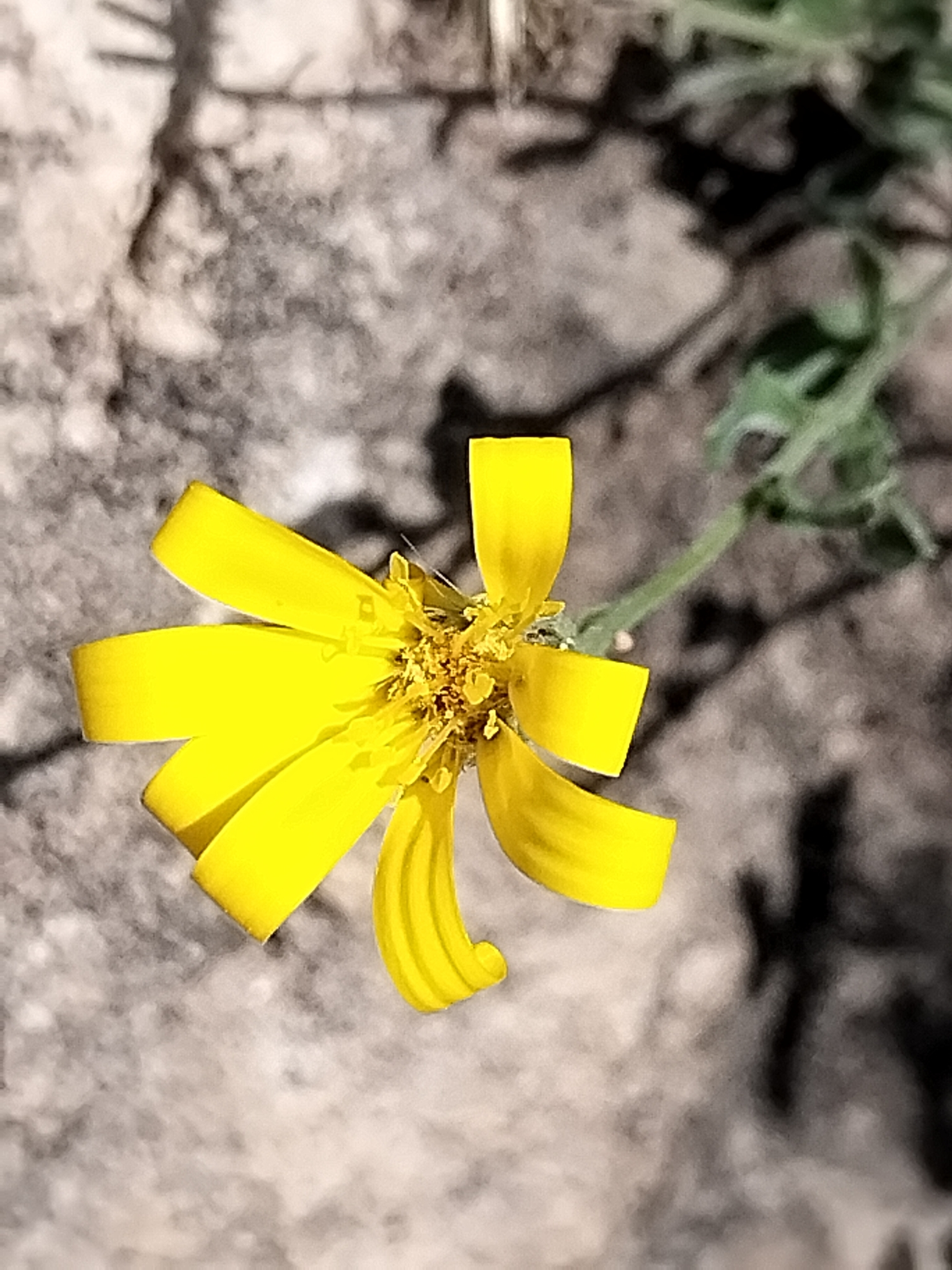

Scientific classification
- Kingdom: Plantae
- Clade: Tracheophytes
- Clade: Angiosperms
- Clade: Eudicots
- Clade: Asterids
- Order: Asterales
- Family: Asteraceae
- Genus: Heterotheca
- Species: H. mexicana

Binomial name
- Heterotheca mexicana Harms ex B.L.Turner 1984

= Heterotheca mexicana =

Species of flowering plant

Heterotheca mexicana is a rare Mexican species of flowering plant in the family Asteraceae. It has been found only in western Durango in northeastern Mexico.
