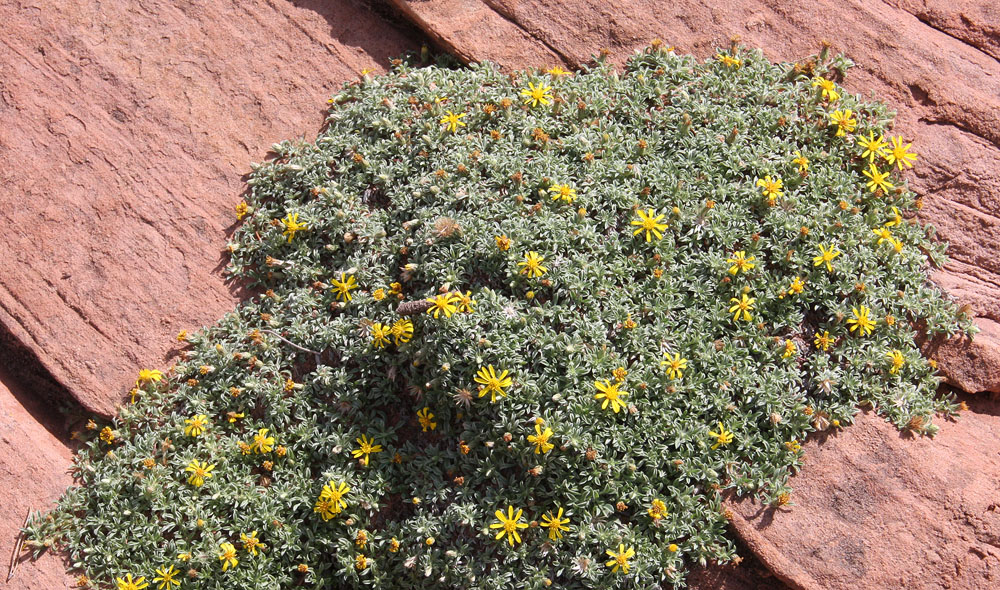
- Heterotheca jonesii in Zion National Park

Scientific classification
- Kingdom: Plantae
- Clade: Tracheophytes
- Clade: Angiosperms
- Clade: Eudicots
- Clade: Asterids
- Order: Asterales
- Family: Asteraceae
- Genus: Heterotheca
- Species: H. jonesii

Binomial name
- Heterotheca jonesii (S.F.Blake) S.L.Welsh & N.D.Atwood 1976

Synonyms
- Chrysopsis jonesii S.F.Blake 1925; Chrysopsis caespitosa M.E. Jones 1895, illegitimate homonym not Nutt. 1834

= Heterotheca jonesii =

Species of flowering plant

Heterotheca jonesii, known by the common name Jones's goldenaster, is a rare North American species of flowering plant in the family Asteraceae. It has been found in the southern part of the state of Utah in the United States.
