= Trichocoronis =

Scientific classification
- Kingdom: Plantae
- Clade: Tracheophytes
- Clade: Angiosperms
- Clade: Eudicots
- Clade: Asterids
- Order: Asterales
- Family: Asteraceae
- Subfamily: Asteroideae
- Tribe: Eupatorieae
- Genus: Trichocoronis; A.Gray

Type species
- Trichocoronis wrightii (Torr. & A.Gray) A.Gray

Synonyms
- Biolettia Greene

Genus of aquatic plants

Trichocoronis is a genus of North American aquatic plants in the tribe Eupatorieae within the family Asteraceae. Bugheal is a common name for plants in this genus.

Trichocoronis is thought to be related to two other aquatic genera in the same tribe: Sclerolepis and Shinnersia. They are annuals or perennials.

Species

- Trichocoronis sessilifolia (S.Schauer) B.L.Rob. - Michoacán, Oaxaca, Jalisco, D.F., México State
- Trichocoronis wrightii (Torr. & A.Gray) A.Gray - Texas, California, Baja California Sur, Sonora, Tamaulipas, San Luis Potosí

formerly included

- Trichocoronis rivularis A.Gray - Shinnersia rivularis (A.Gray) R.M.King & H.Rob.
