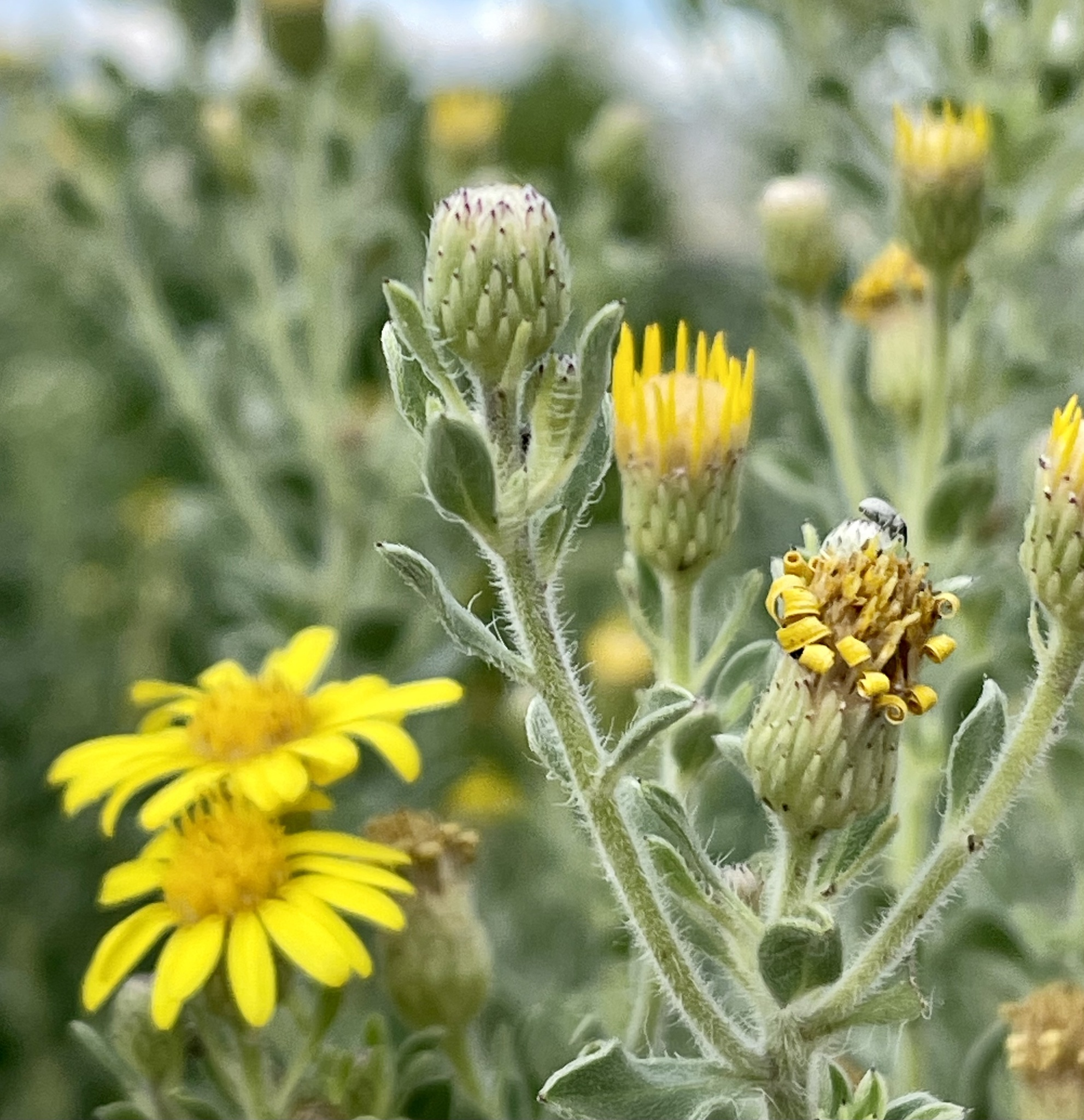
- In New Mexico

Conservation status
- Imperiled (NatureServe)

Scientific classification
- Kingdom: Plantae
- Clade: Tracheophytes
- Clade: Angiosperms
- Clade: Eudicots
- Clade: Asterids
- Order: Asterales
- Family: Asteraceae
- Genus: Heterotheca
- Species: H. zionensis

Binomial name
- Heterotheca zionensis Semple 1987

Synonyms
- Chrysopsis zionensis (Semple) S.L.Welsh

= Heterotheca zionensis =

Species of flowering plant

Heterotheca zionensis, the Zion goldenaster, is a North American species of flowering plant in the family Asteraceae. It grows in Utah, Arizona, New Mexico and western Texas. The plant has also reportedly been found in southeastern Idaho and northwestern Colorado, but these are most likely introductions.
