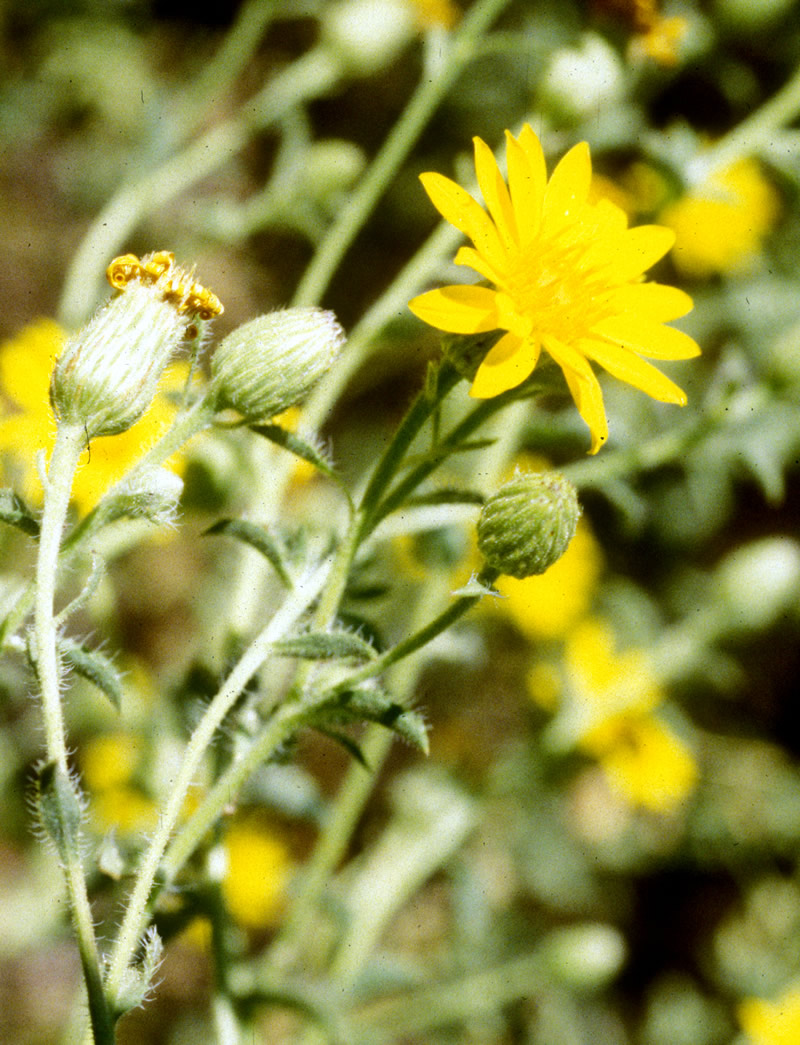

Conservation status
- Critically Imperiled (NatureServe)

Scientific classification
- Kingdom: Plantae
- Clade: Embryophytes
- Clade: Tracheophytes
- Clade: Spermatophytes
- Clade: Angiosperms
- Clade: Eudicots
- Clade: Asterids
- Order: Asterales
- Family: Asteraceae
- Genus: Heterotheca
- Species: H. shevockii

Binomial name
- Heterotheca shevockii (Semple) Semple 1996

Synonyms
- Heterotheca villosa var. shevockii Semple 1993

= Heterotheca shevockii =

Species of plant

Heterotheca shevockii is a rare species of flowering plant in the family Asteraceae known by the common names Kern Canyon false goldenaster and Shevock's goldenaster. It is endemic to California in the United States, where it is known only from Kern County. It grows along a 21-mile stretch of the Kern River.

Heterotheca shevockii is a perennial herb growing 28 to 131 centimeters (11.2-52.4 inches) in height, often with many erect stems. The stems are hairy to bristly. The lance-shaped leaves are up to 6.5 centimeters (2.6 inches) long by 1.6 cm (0.64 inches) wide. The inflorescence contains 3-70 flower heads borne on hairy, glandular peduncles. Each head contains up to 18 yellow ray florets each up to a centimeter long, and many disc florets at the center. The fruit is an achene which may be over a centimeter (>0.4 inches) long including its pappus. Flowering occurs mostly in August and September, but it may be seen in flower between January and November.

Heterotheca shevockii grows in chaparral and woodland habitat in sandy soils in crevices and ditches near the river. There are about 8 known populations of this plant, totalling 246 individuals.
