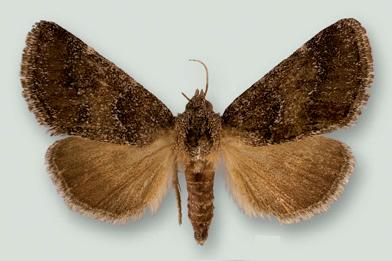
- Female
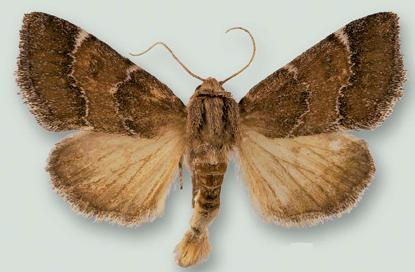
- Male

Scientific classification
- Kingdom: Animalia
- Phylum: Arthropoda
- Class: Insecta
- Order: Lepidoptera
- Superfamily: Noctuoidea
- Family: Noctuidae
- Genus: Schinia
- Species: S. saturata

Binomial name
- Schinia saturata Grote, 1874

= Schinia saturata =

Species of moth

Schinia saturata, the brown flower moth, is a moth of the family Noctuidae. The species was first described by Augustus Radcliffe Grote in 1874. It is found in the United States from south Texas to South Dakota, southeast Arizona and from Florida to South Carolina.

Illustration

The wingspan is about 25 mm. There is one generation per year.

The larvae feed on Heterotheca subaxillaris and Pityopsis graminifolia.
