= Tomentaurum =

Scientific classification
- Kingdom: Plantae
- Clade: Tracheophytes
- Clade: Angiosperms
- Clade: Eudicots
- Clade: Asterids
- Order: Asterales
- Family: Asteraceae
- Subfamily: Asteroideae
- Tribe: Astereae
- Genus: Tomentaurum; G.L.Nesom (1991)

Type species
- Heterotheca vandevenderorum B.L.Turner

Genus of plants

Tomentaurum is a genus of Mexican plants in the family Asteraceae. Its species are native to northern Mexico.

== Species ==
As of May 2023, Plants of the World Online accepted two species:

- Tomentaurum niveum (S.Watson) G.L.Nesom
- Tomentaurum vandevenderorum (B.L.Turner) G.L.Nesom
