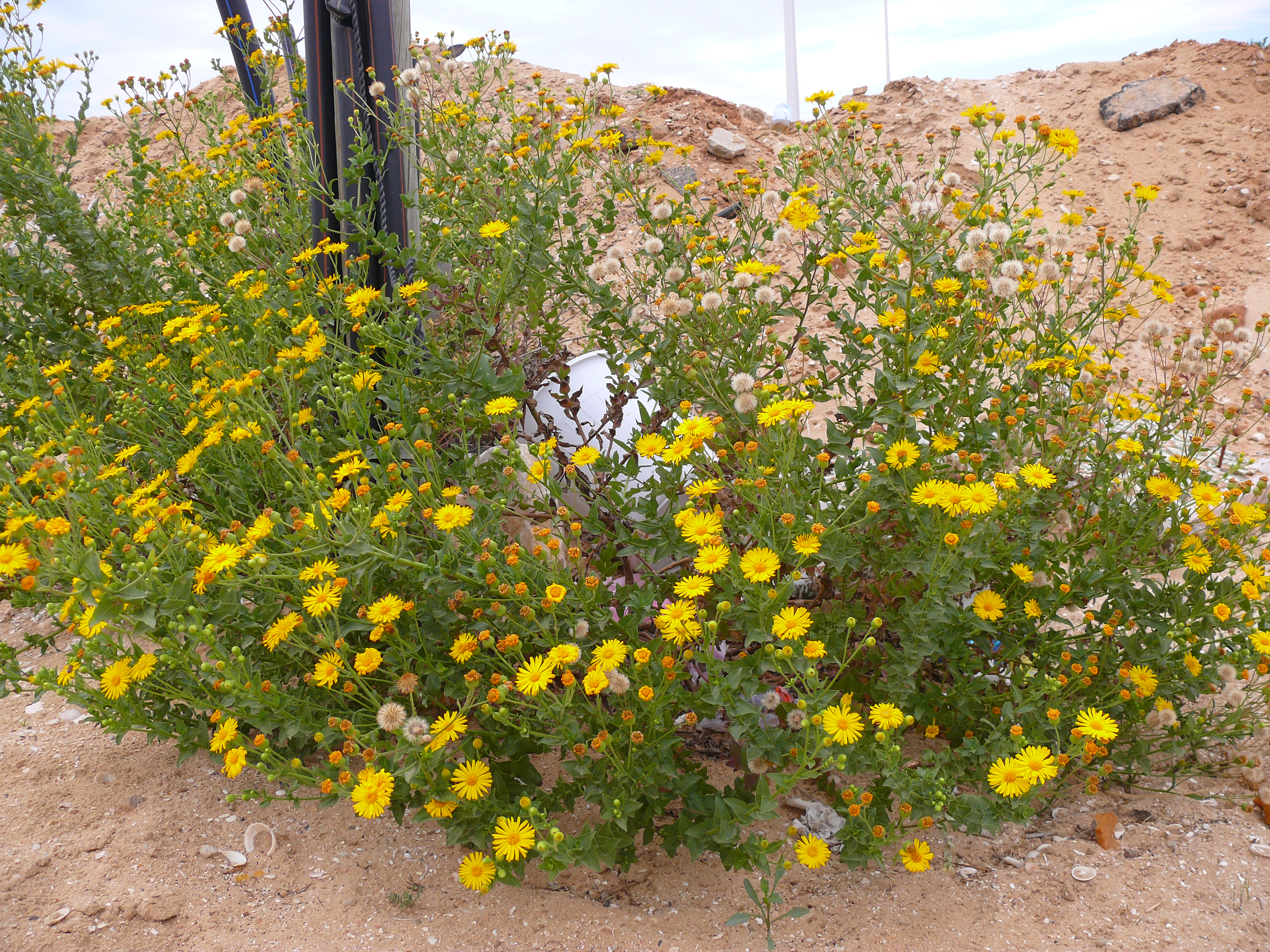

Conservation status
- Secure (NatureServe)

Scientific classification
- Kingdom: Plantae
- Clade: Tracheophytes
- Clade: Angiosperms
- Clade: Eudicots
- Clade: Asterids
- Order: Asterales
- Family: Asteraceae
- Genus: Heterotheca
- Species: H. subaxillaris

Binomial name
- Heterotheca subaxillaris (Lam.) Britton & Rusby 1887

Synonyms
- Synonymy: Inula subaxillaris Lam. 1789; Calycium divaricatum Elliott; Calycium scabrum Elliott; Chrysopsis scabra (Pursh) Elliott; Diplopappus scaber (Pursh) Hook.; Heterotheca chrysopsidis DC.; Heterotheca lamarckii Cass.; Heterotheca scabra (Pursh) DC.; Inula scabra Pursh; Stelmanis scabra (Pursh) Raf.

= Heterotheca subaxillaris =

Species of flowering plant

Heterotheca subaxillaris, known by the common name camphorweed, is a North American species of flowering plant in the family Asteraceae.

== Distribution and habitat ==
It is widespread across much of the United States (from California to Massachusetts) as well as Mexico and Belize.

H. subaxillaris may be found in habitats such as upper beaches, longleaf pine-wiregrass savannas, and pine-scrub oak sand ridges.

== Description ==
Heterotheca subaxillaris is a perennial, aromatic herb up to 203 centimeters (80 inches or 6 2/3 feet) in height, often with several erect stems. The stems are hairy to bristly. The inflorescence contains 3-180 flower heads in a flat-topped array. Each head contains 15–35; yellow ray florets surrounding 25–60 disc florets at the center.

== Ecology ==
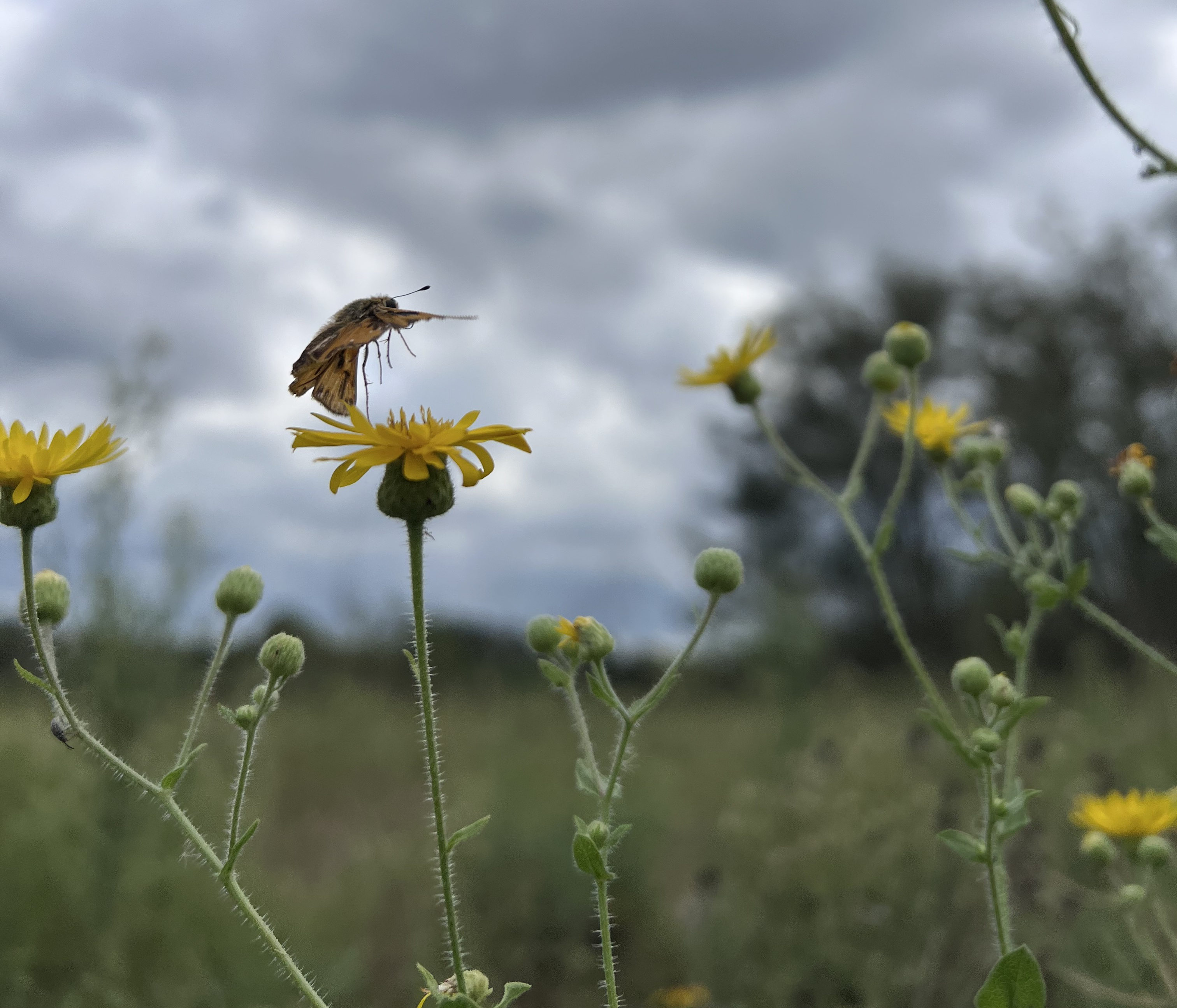
A fiery skipper lands atop a flowerhead during the Autumn equinox

Sandy parts are common habitat for H. subaxillaris. They thrive in prairies with high sand content. Human-disturbed areas are also preferred, such as roadsides or waste areas.
Camphorweed florets are adapted to suit generalist pollinators to an equal or greater extent than specialists, such as plasterer bees. Other bees are the most common of these generalist visitors, collecting nectar and pollen in exchange for transferal of male gametes between flowers.
Larvae of insects such as brown flower moths and agromyzid flies feed on the stems and/or flower heads of the camphorweed.

== Chemistry ==
The leaf volatiles from which the name "camphorweed" is derived include camphor, but as a minor constituent (less than 2%); of 41 documented volatiles, for example, caryophyllene, pinene, borneol, myrcene, and limonene each comprised over 5% of the total.
