= Lloyd Herbert Shinners =

Canadian-American botanist (1918–1971)

- Born: September 22, 1918; Bluesky, Alberta
- Died: February 16, 1971 (aged 52); Dallas, Texas
- Resting place: Cedarburg, Wisconsin
- Education: University of Wisconsin
- Scientific career
- Fields: Botany
- Workplaces: Southern Methodist University
- Doctoral advisor: Norman Carter Fassett
- Notable students: Billie Lee Turner
- Author abbrev. (botany): Shinners

Lloyd Herbert Shinners (September 22, 1918 – February 16, 1971) was a Canadian-American botanist and professor who had expertise in the flora of Texas and Wisconsin.

== Early life ==
Shinners was born in Bluesky, Alberta on September 22, 1918. His family moved to Milwaukee, Wisconsin when he was five, and he went on to graduate valedictorian from Lincoln High School. He continued his education at the University of Wisconsin–Madison, where he earned a Ph.D. under Norman Carter Fassett in 1943. He worked for the city of Milwaukee before moving to Dallas, Texas in 1945.

== Career ==
Shinners worked for the Southern Methodist University as a research assistant, before being placed in charge of the university's herbarium. In 1960, he attained a full professorship. Through his guidance, the herbarium grew from 20,000 specimens to over 340,000. He was specifically interested in the Compositae.

== Publications ==
Shinners authored 274 articles, and published a comprehensive 514 page Flora of north-central Texas.

== Eponyms ==
Shinners was the namesake of one genus, Shinnersia, and more than 15 species, including:

- Thelypodiopsis shinnersii (M.C.Johnst.) Rollins
- Ipomoea shinnersii D.F.Austin
- Carex shinnersii P.Rothr. & Reznicek

== Legacy ==
Shinner's library of botanical books and collection of plant specimens formed the initial collections of the Botanical Research Institute of Texas in Fort Worth when it was founded in 1987.
