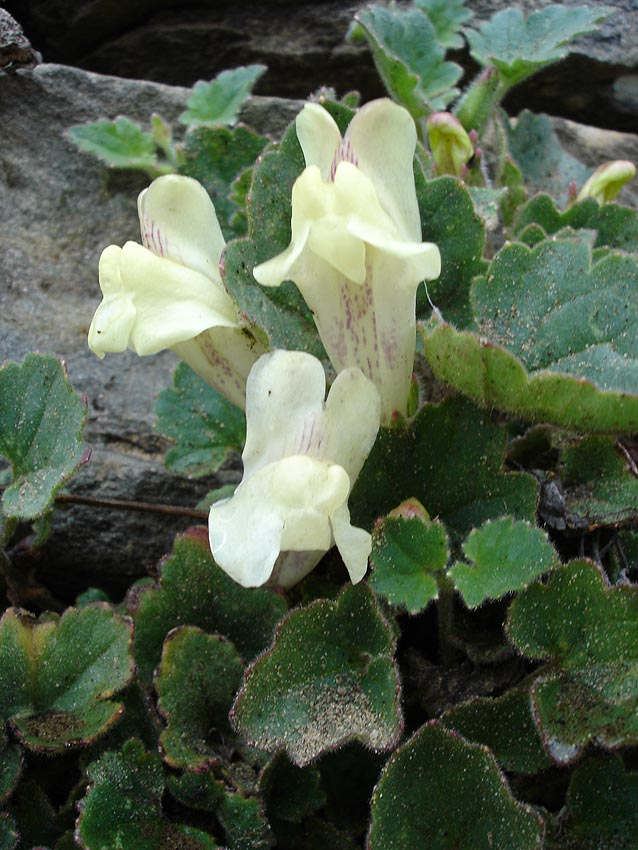

Scientific classification
- Kingdom: Plantae
- Clade: Tracheophytes
- Clade: Angiosperms
- Clade: Eudicots
- Clade: Asterids
- Order: Lamiales
- Family: Plantaginaceae
- Tribe: Antirrhineae
- Genus: Asarina; Mill. (1757)
- Species: A. procumbens

Binomial name
- Asarina procumbens Mill. (1768)

Synonyms
- Antirrhinum asarifolium Salisb.; Antirrhinum asarina L.; Antirrhinum asarinum Lam.; Antirrhinum quinquelobatum St.-Lag.; Asarina cordifolia Moench; Asarina lobelii Quer

= Asarina =

Genus of flowering plants

Asarina is a flowering plant genus of only one species, Asarina procumbens Mill. the trailing snapdragon, which is native to France and Spain and introduced in Germany, Switzerland, Austria, Hungary and the United Kingdom. Originally placed in the Scrophulariaceae (figwort family), the genus has more recently been moved to the Plantaginaceae (plantain family). Species from North America formerly placed in the genus Asarina are now placed in Holmgrenanthe, Lophospermum, Mabrya and Maurandya, as well as Neogaerrhinum. Asarina is now regarded as exclusively an Old World genus.

== Description ==
The single remaining species of the now monotypic genus, A. procumbens is a foetid, strongly pubescent, viscid subshrub of trailing/mat-forming habit reaching a height of only 10-20cm. The somewhat woody main stems give rise to lax creeping/cascading stems bearing opposite, long-petioled, hairy, lobed, reniform-to-cordate leaves with crenate and often red-tinged margins. Flowers solitary or in short racemes of only two or three, fragrant, bumblebee-pollinated, borne in the leaf axils. Corolla cream-coloured, somewhat resembling that of Antirrhinum, the tube bearing faint violet striations, the upper part divided into two keel-like lips, the lower bearing paired inflated lobes, concealing the corolla tube, with a three-lobed margin; pistil violet, persistent, stamens four. Base of corolla bearing (starting behind inflated lobes and extending into corolla throat) a dense mat or beard of deep yellow trichomes. Calyx tubular, five-toothed, densely hairy. Peduncle narrow where joined to stem, thickening greatly to junction with fruiting calyx, reflexed so as to lie parallel to capsule. Fruit a dry capsule, glabrous, subglobose, shorter than the calyx and dehiscing at the apex by two openings separating three valves, the central valve bearing the persistent withered pistil. Seeds small, brownish-buff, roughly conical, testa finely incised with deep sinuous furrows. Seed distribution is by epizoochory, the sticky fruiting calyces becoming attached to the fur of mammals or the feathers of birds, allowing the small seeds to trickle from the dry, open capsules.

== Endangered habitat ==
A. procumbens is a semi-evergreen alpine chasmophyte, favouring partial shade, its preferred habitat being crevices in silica-rich, non-sedimentary rocks. This type of habitat - "Mediterranean siliceous inland cliff" - is designated by endangered habitat code H3.1d by the European Red List of Habitats. The term siliceous cliffs (in this context) refers to those which are composed chiefly of quartz-rich rocks (making them of an acidic character) of either igneous type, such as granite, diorite and andesite, or metamorphic type, such as gneiss, slate, schist and quartzite. Low-altitude cliffs of this type - as favoured by A. procumbens - are more affected by human disturbances than high mountain cliffs, as the latter often occur within nature reserves and other protected areas. Cliffs at low altitudes, by contrast, are susceptible to a wide variety of threats including the shoring-up of cliffs over roads and railway lines, sport and leisure activities -particularly rock-climbing - and, at lower elevations, mining, quarrying and invasive/alien plants. In the French part of its range A. procumbens is seldom to be found growing at altitudes below 400m, with an upper limit of some 1800m.

== Distribution in France and Spain ==
A. procumbens is not a common species in the French part of its range, even having protected status in the Auvergne region. Its strongholds in France comprise the Pyrénées-Orientales (taking in the Franco-Catalan area of historic Rousillon) and the Massif central - notably the Cévennes. In Spain the plant is native to the Pyrenean region, but may be found naturalised elsewhere.

== Cultivation ==
A. procumbens grows best in somewhat dry partial shade. Soil: well-drained, sandy/gravelly, humus-rich, moderately moist: dislikes excessive winter wetness. Blooms most profusely in climates in which summers are not excessively hot. Pollinated by bumblebees. Plant is evergreen in mild climates, although may be killed outright by heavy frost, in which case may be propagated afresh: self-seeds readily. Uses: trailing alpine or ground cover. Thrives and increases rapidly as a container plant. Not usually invasive in gardens, though one report of aggressive growth from southeastern U.S.A. Pruning: not usually needed, though may be cut back in autumn if foliage is spent or untidy. Hardiness zone: U.K. H3. USDA zones 8,9 & 10.

== Weed status in Australia ==
A. procumbens has escaped from cultivation to become an attractive (and not, at present, invasive) weed in the inner suburbs of the Australian city of Melbourne, managing to grow in such harsh urban habitats as cracks in the mortar of brick walls and kerbstones and the juncture between brick walls and tarmac. Such weedy populations are short-lived and do not produce abundant seed, because of the current absence of bumblebees from the Australian insect fauna (in its native habitats in France and Spain Asarina is buzz-pollinated by bumblebee species): the Australian native bees and introduced honeybees of Melbourne find Asarina flowers resistant to their attempts at pollination. This situation is, however, likely to change for the worse, should bumblebee species already present in neighbouring Tasmania cross the Bass Strait, in which case bumblebee-pollinated species - such as Asarina - hitherto considered "safe" (i.e. non-invasive) garden plants in the state of Victoria - would rapidly become invasive due to increased production of viable seed. Michael Cook hypothesises that the Asarina colonies currently observable in suburban Melbourne may be more the result of wind-blown drift of packaged seed sown by local gardeners than of the setting of seed by garden plants and plants maintaining a foothold as weeds.

== Species reassigned to other genera ==
At one time placed in Asarina:

- Asarina acerifolia (Pennell) Pennell = Mabrya acerifolia (Pennell) Elisens
- Asarina antirrhiniflora (Humb. & Bonpl. ex Willd.) Pennell = Maurandya antirrhiniflora Humb. & Bonpl. ex Willd.
- Asarina barclayana (Lindl.) Pennell = Maurandya barclayana Lindl.
- Asarina erubescens (D.Don) Pennell = Lophospermum erubescens D.Don
- Asarina filipes (A.Gray) Pennell = Neogaerrhinum filipes (A.Gray) Rothm.
- Asarina flaviflora (I.M.Johnst.) Pennell = Mabrya flaviflora (I.M.Johnst.) D.A.Sutton
- Asarina geniculata (B.L.Rob. & Fernald) Pennell = Mabrya geniculata (B.L.Rob. & Fernald) Elisens
- Asarina hirsuta Pennell = Mabrya erecta (Hemsley) Elisens
- Asarina lophospermum (L.H.Bailey) Pennell = Lophospermum scandens D.Don
- Asarina petrophila (Coville & C.V. Morton) Pennell = Holmgrenanthe petrophila (Coville & C.V.Morton) Elisens
- Asarina purpusii (Brandegee) Pennell = Lophospermum purpusii (Brandegee) Rothm.
- Asarina rosei (Munz) Pennell = Mabrya rosei (Munz) Elisens
- Asarina scandens (Cav.) Pennell = Maurandya scandens (Cav.) Pers.
- Asarina stricta (Hook. & Arn.) Pennell = Neogaerrhinum strictum (Hook. & Arn.) Rothm.
- Asarina wislizeni (Engelm. ex A.Gray) Pennell = Maurandya wislizeni Engelm. ex A.Gray

== Gallery ==
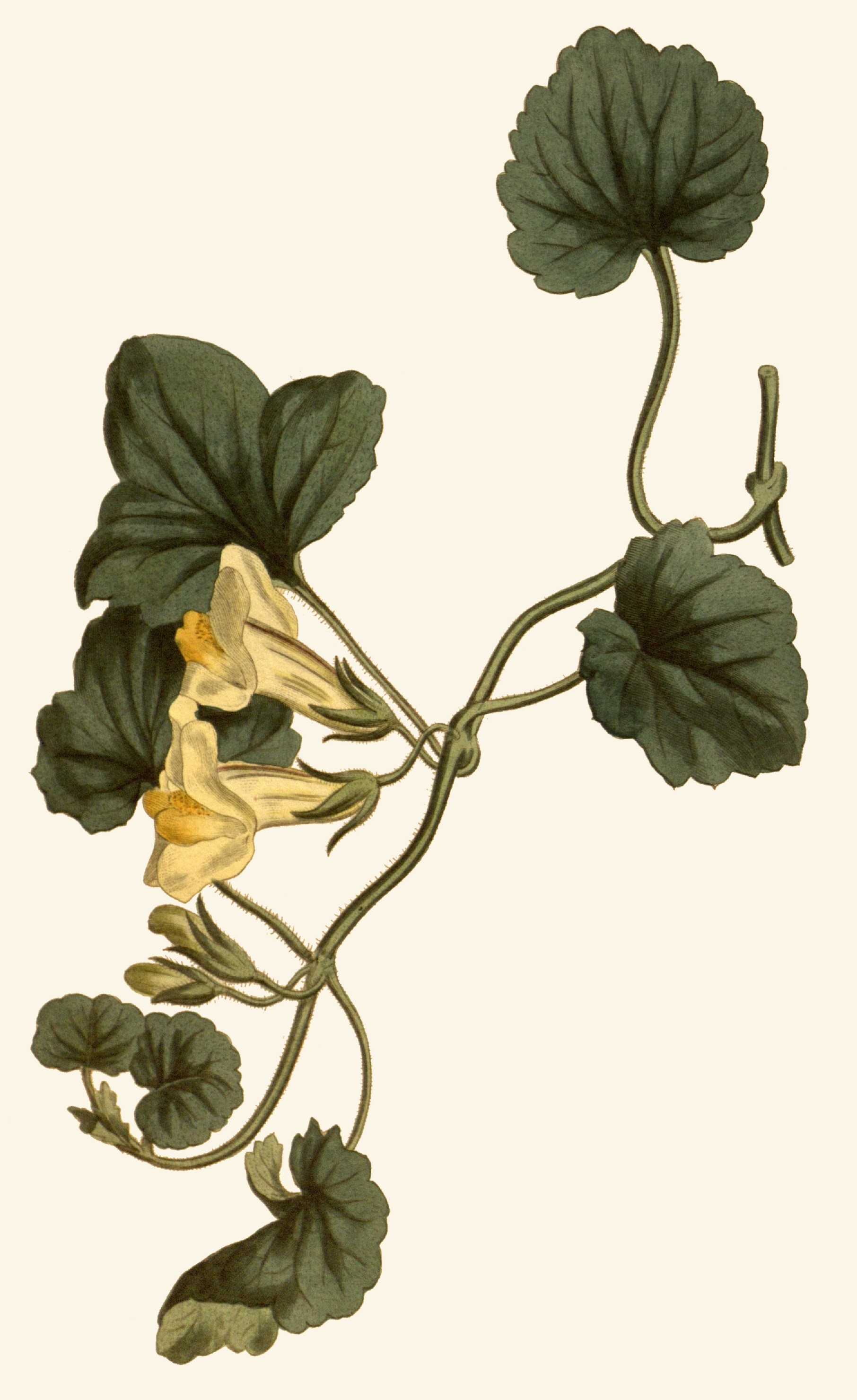
Colour plate from Curtis's Botanical Magazine 1806

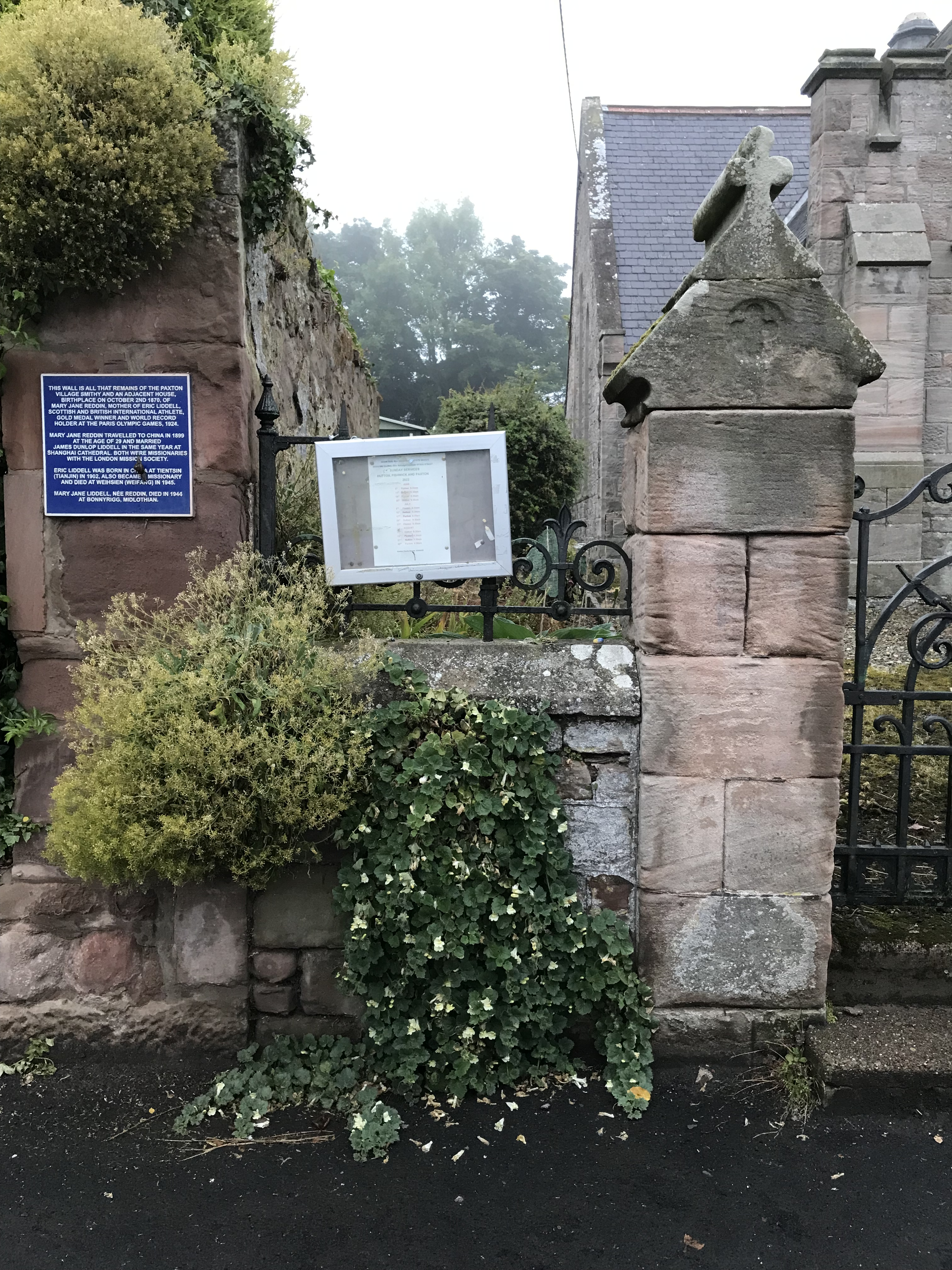
Specimen growing out of crevices in front wall of church grounds, Paxton, Scottish Borders

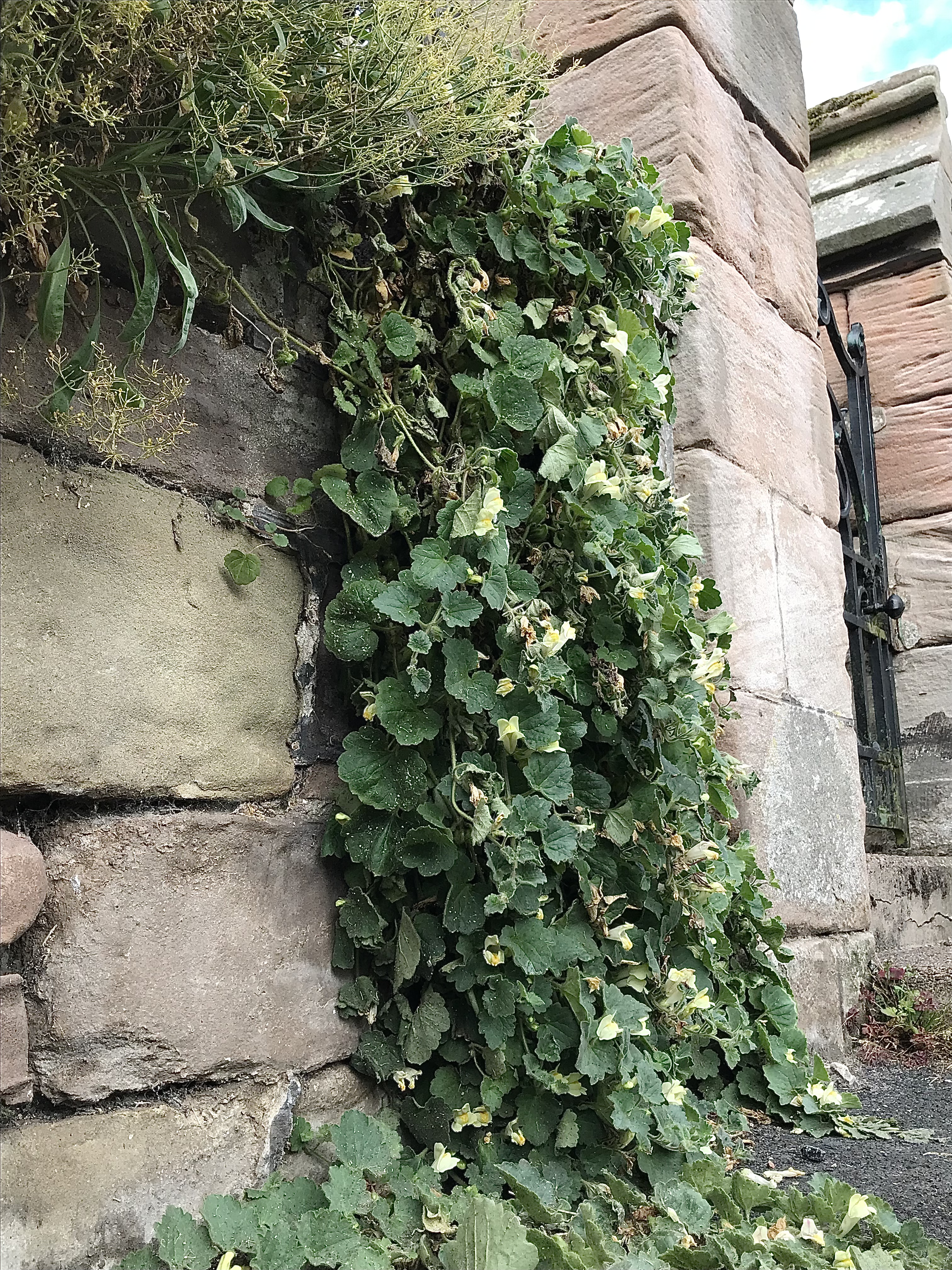
Detail of cascading stems of church gate specimen

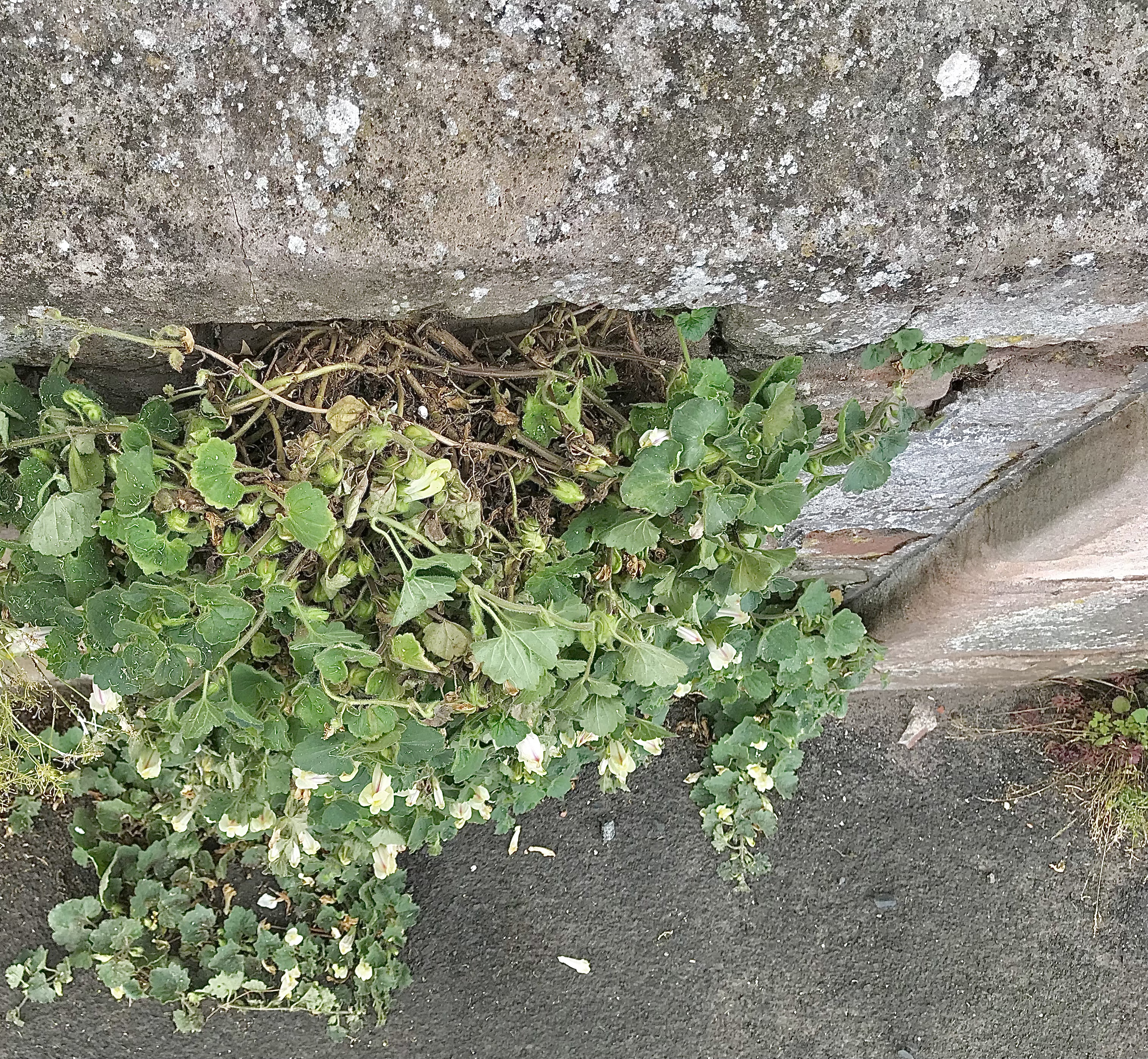
Woody growth at top of specimen producing cascade of flowering stems

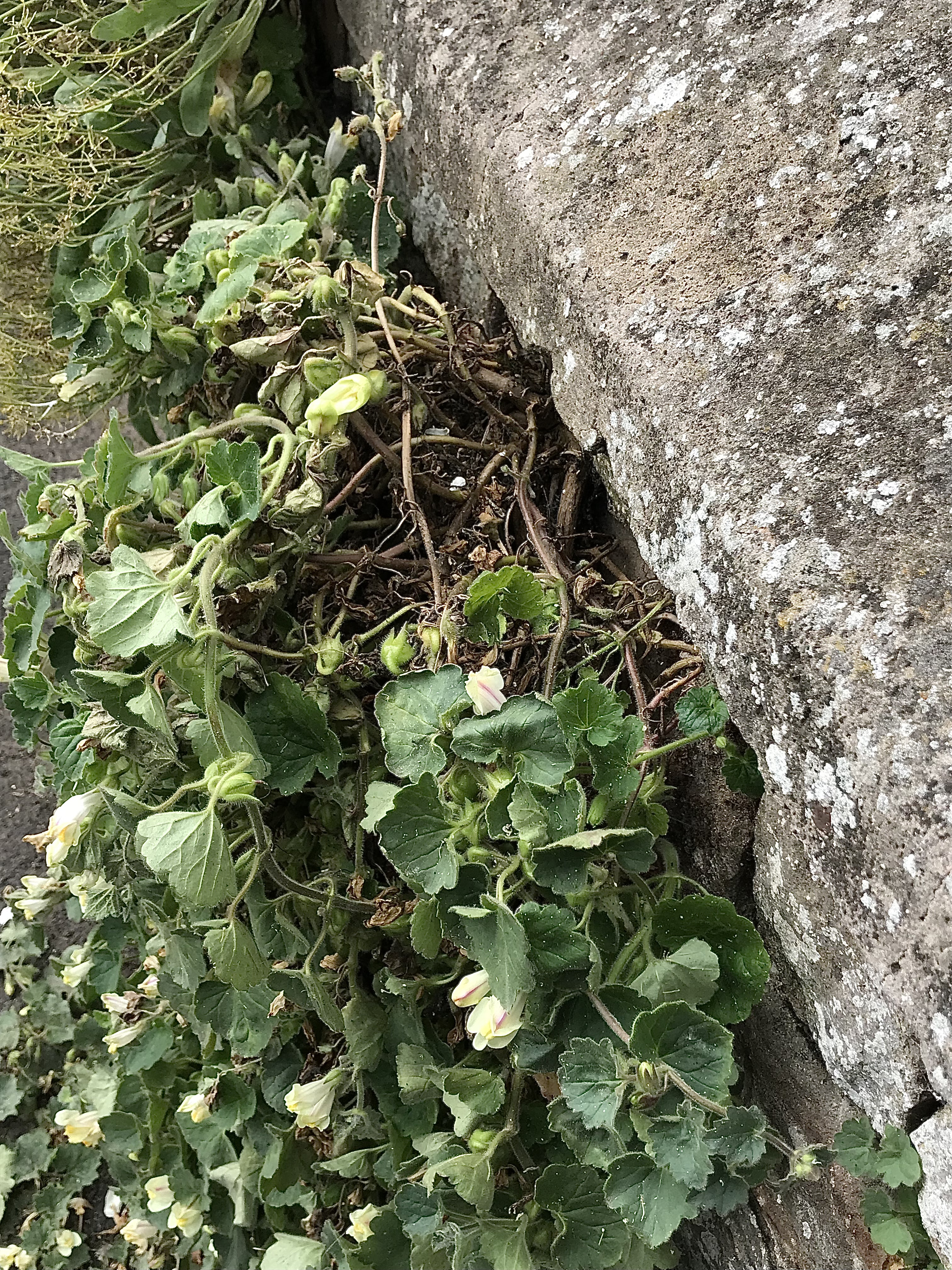
Mid-shot of woody growth and cascade of flowering stems

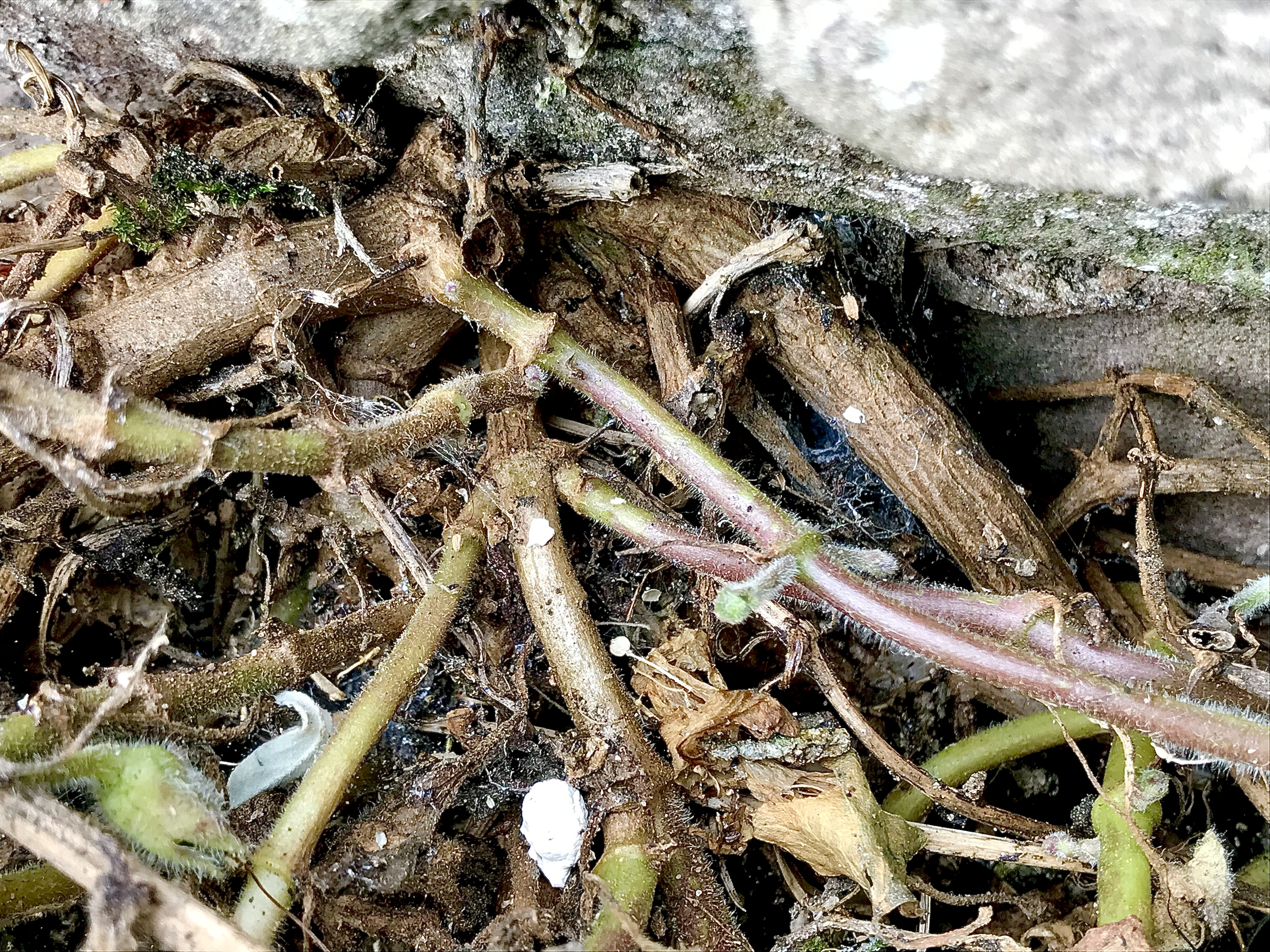
Detail of woody stems growing out of crevice in church gate wall.

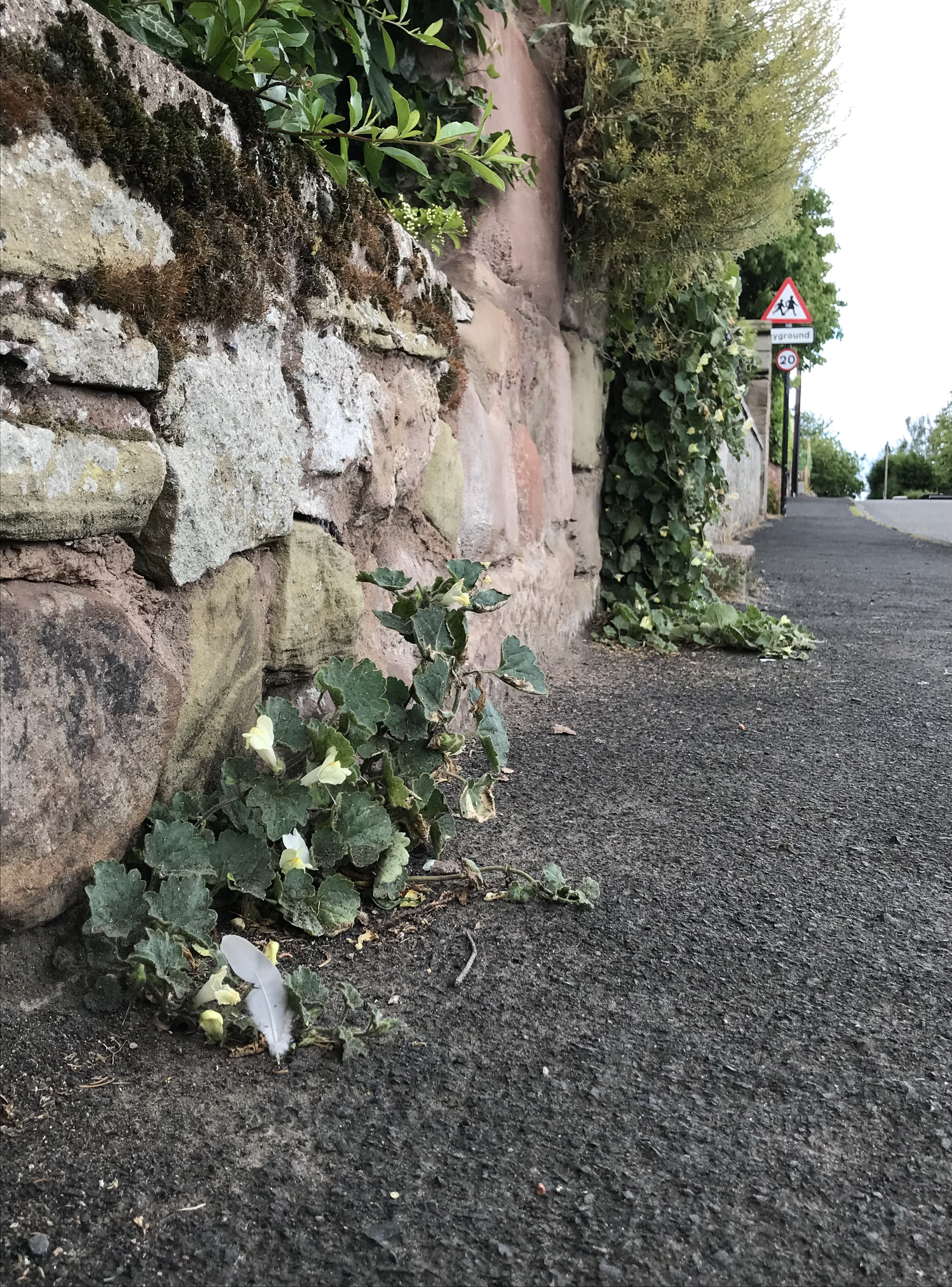
Outlying plant growing between wall and tarmac at pavement level

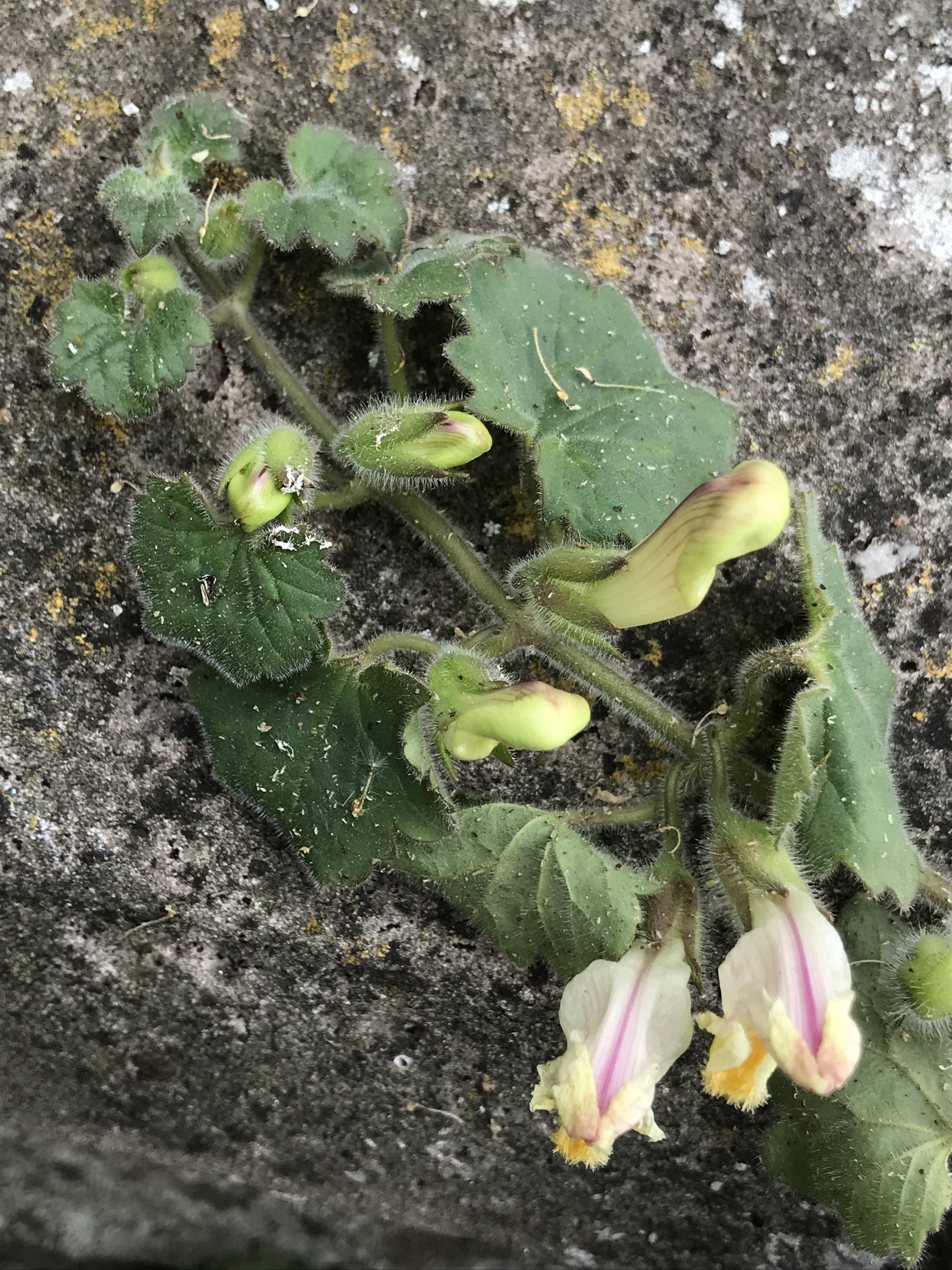
Flowering shoot baring buds at varying stages of development and senescent flowers

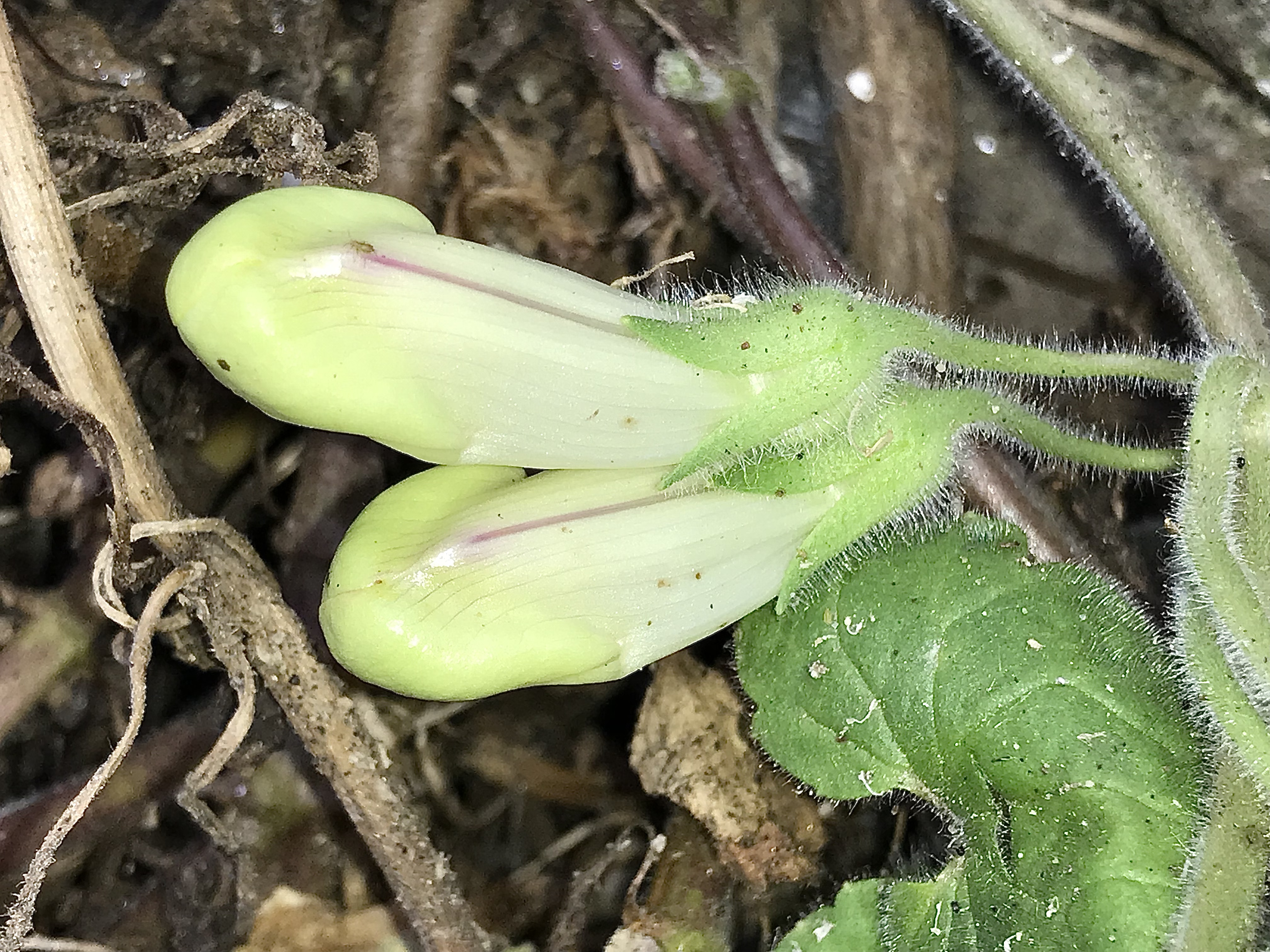
Paired, slipper-shaped flower buds borne at a leaf node

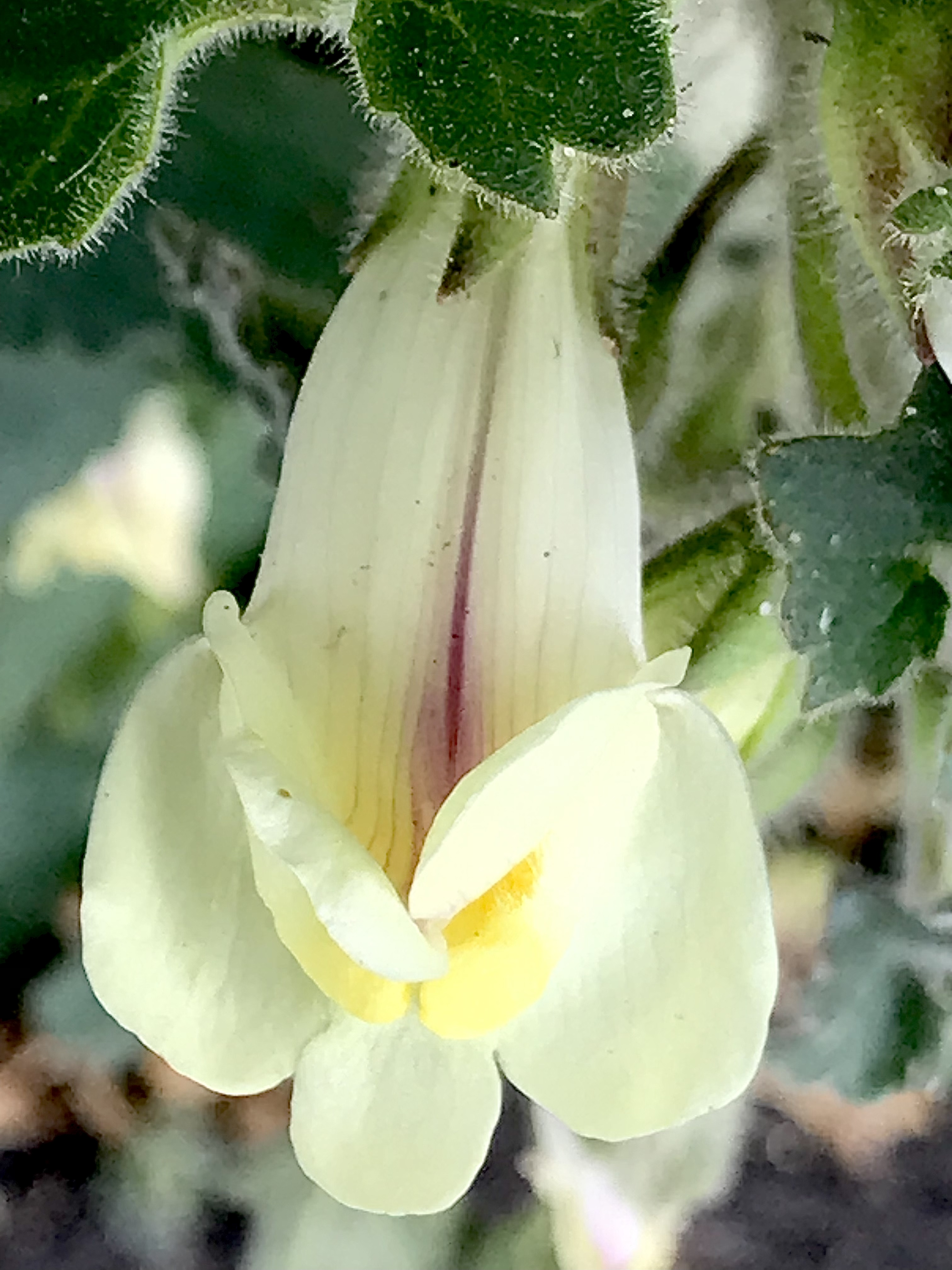
Single flower, viewed from above, revealing purple dorsal stripe

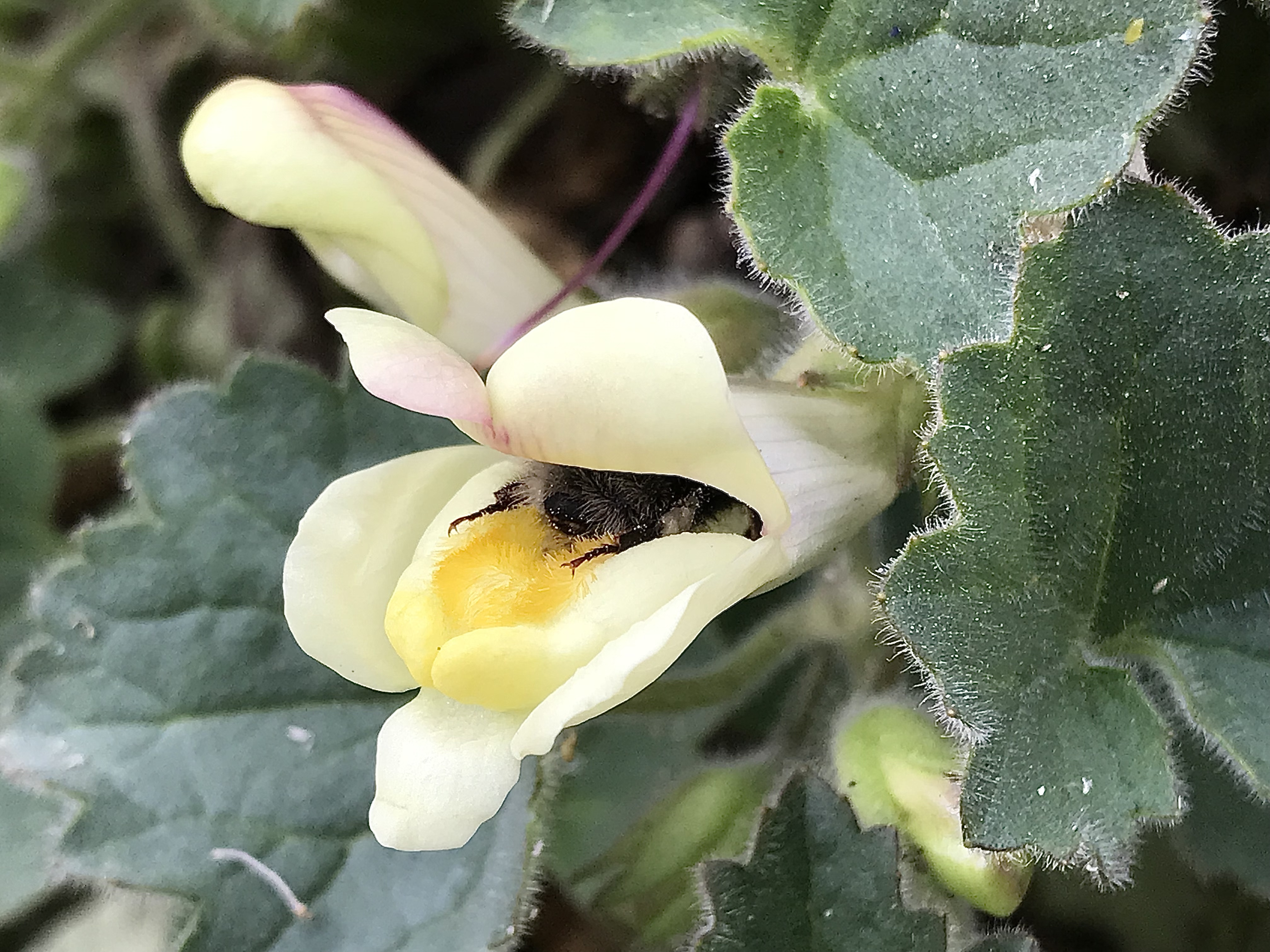
Close-up of flower of Paxton specimen being pollinated by garden bumblebee,

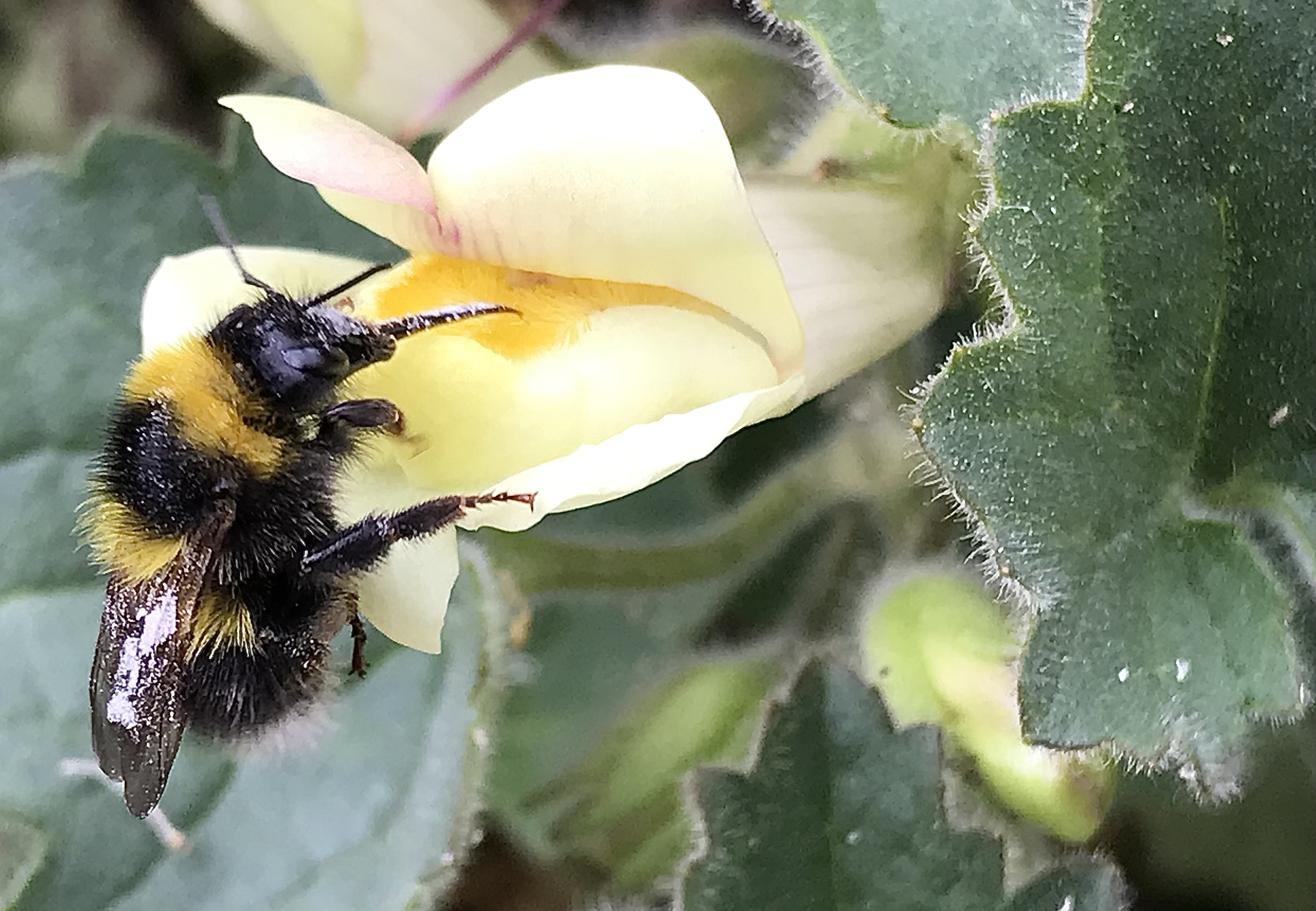
Pollen-covered garden bumblebee, newly emerged from flower

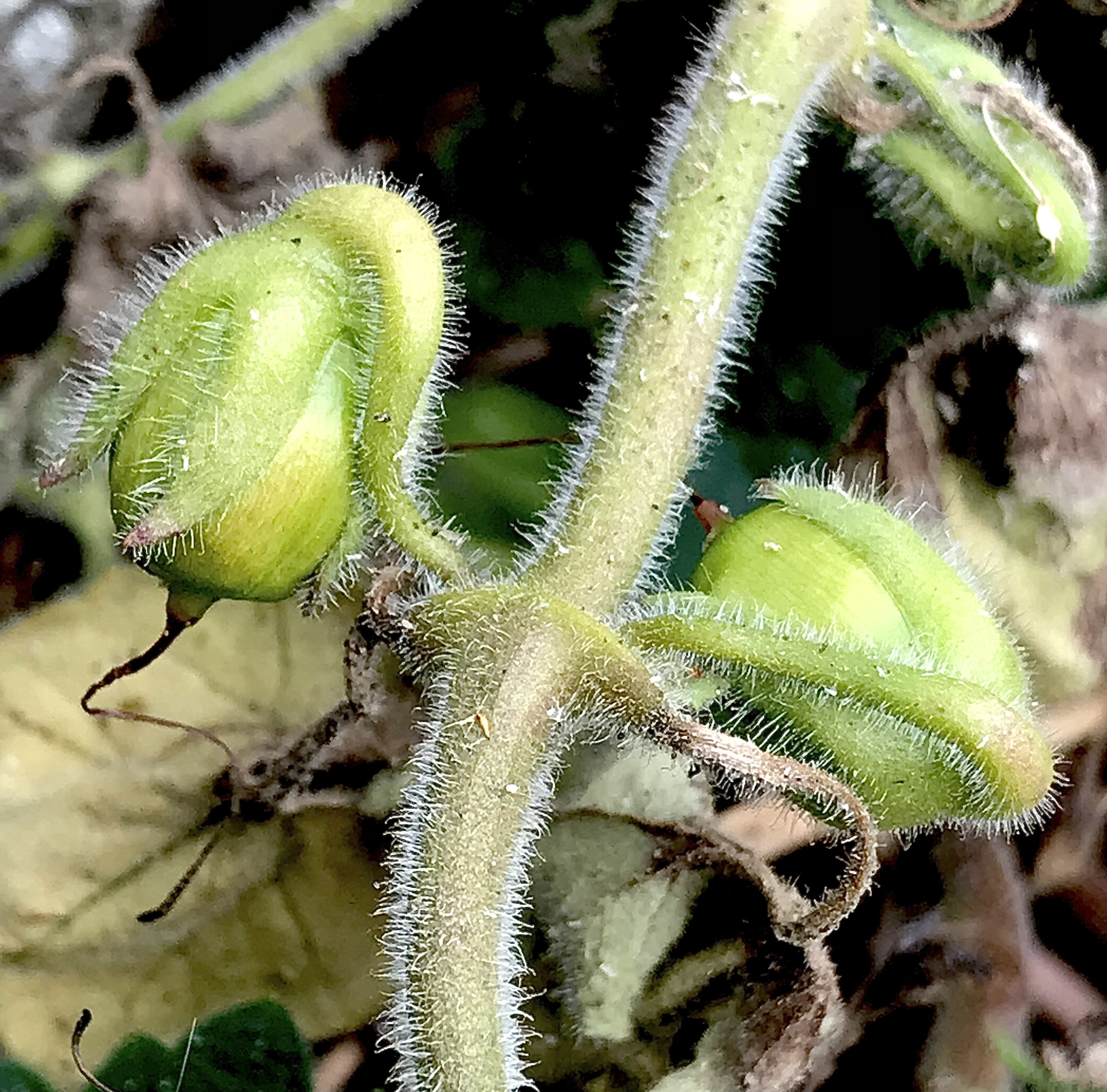
Paired seed capsules, showing distinctive reflexed peduncles, borne at a node with paired opposite leaves

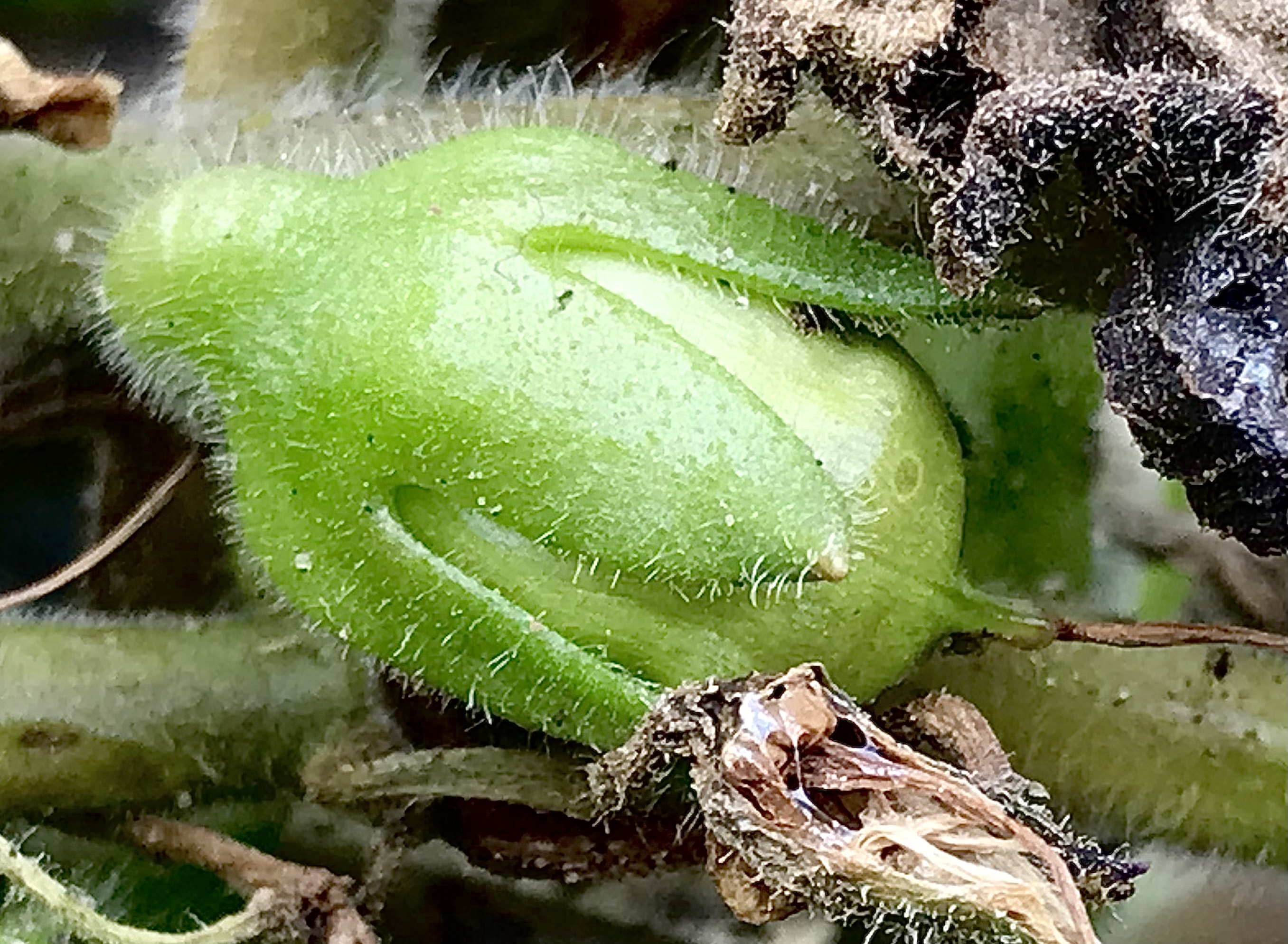
Single, ripening seed capsule, greatly enlarged: contrast between pubescent peduncle and calyx and glabrous capsule

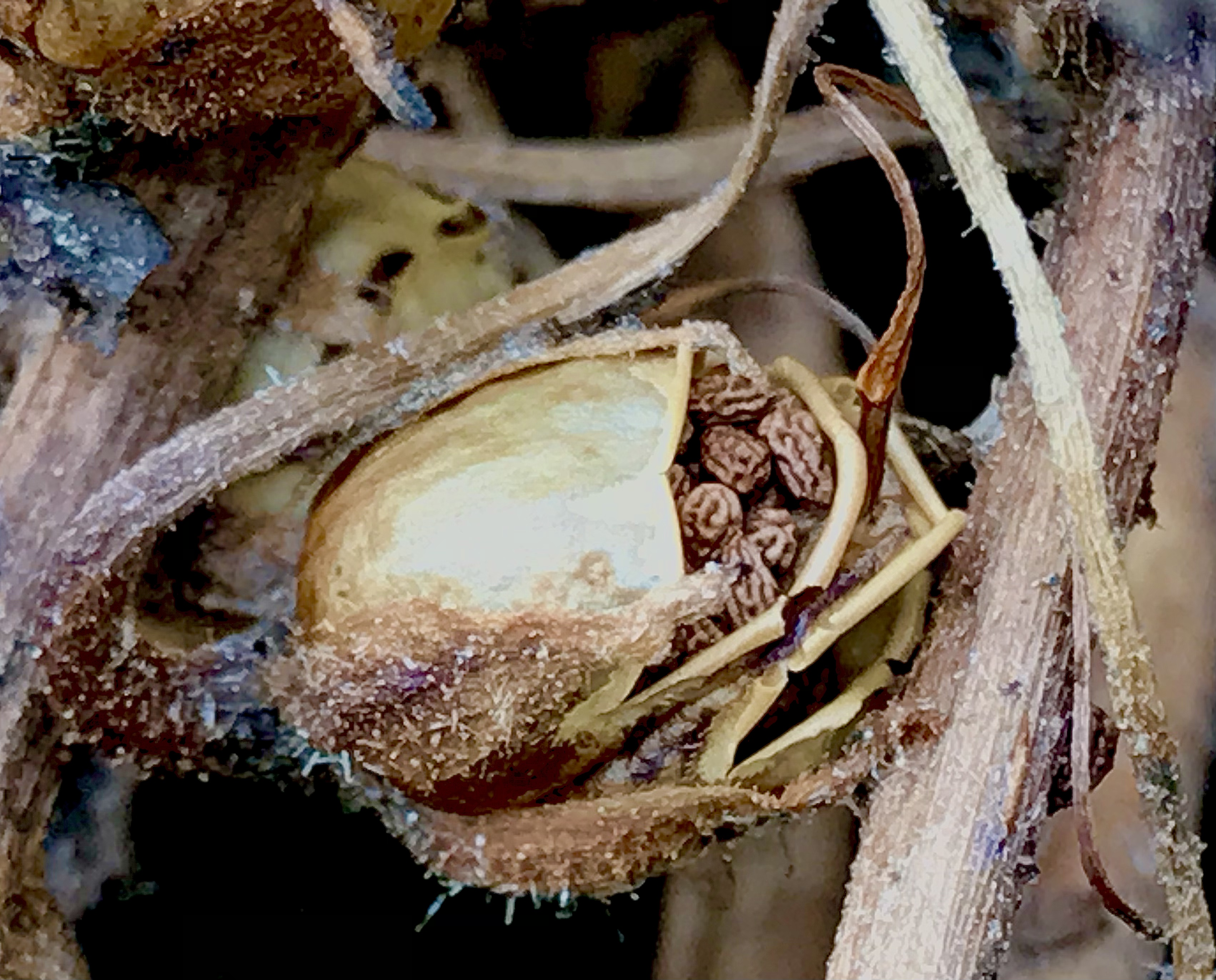
Ripe, buff seed capsule (showing reflexed peduncle) dehiscing by three valves to reveal brain-like seeds

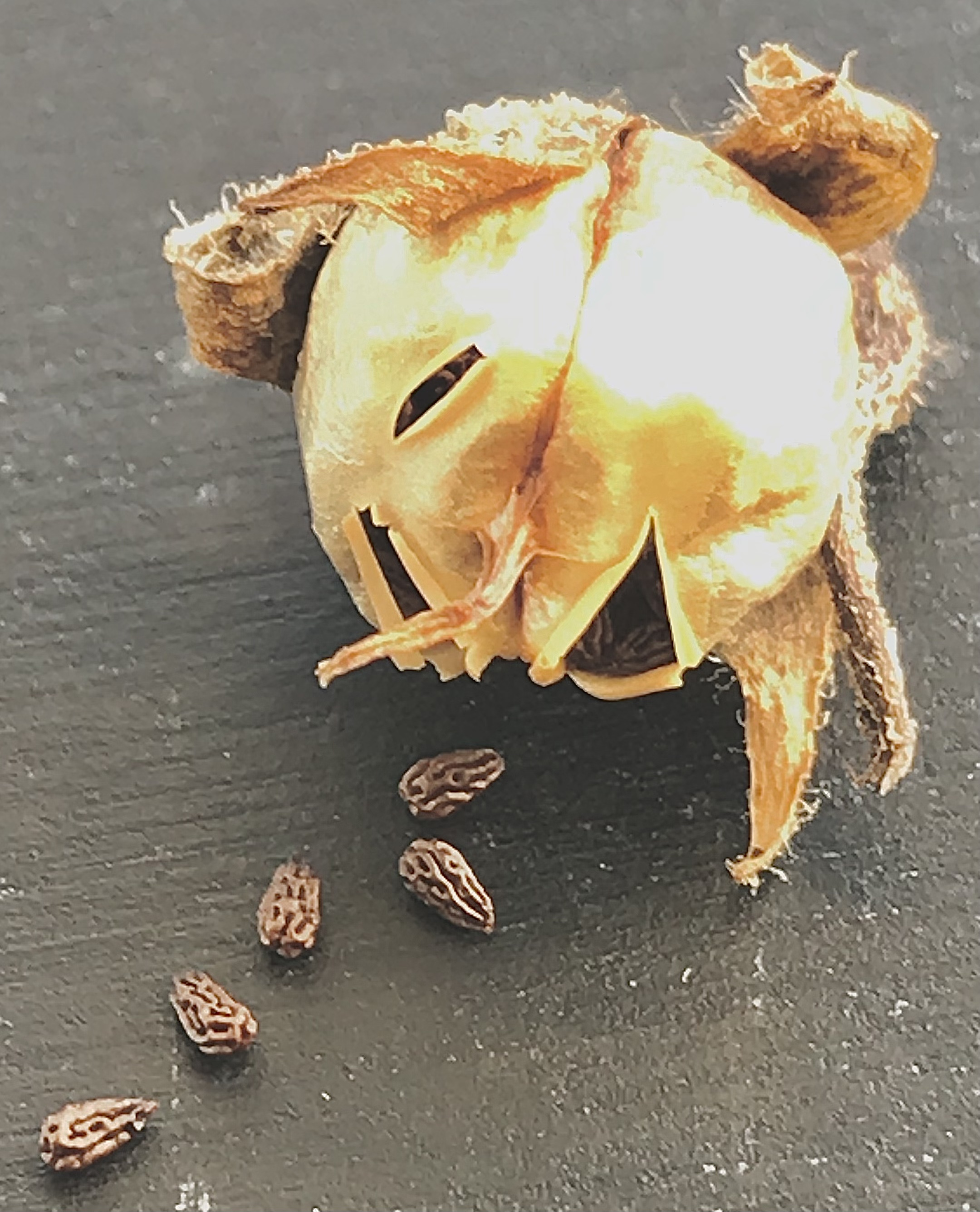
Detached, imperfectly dehisced, ripe seed capsule with shed seeds

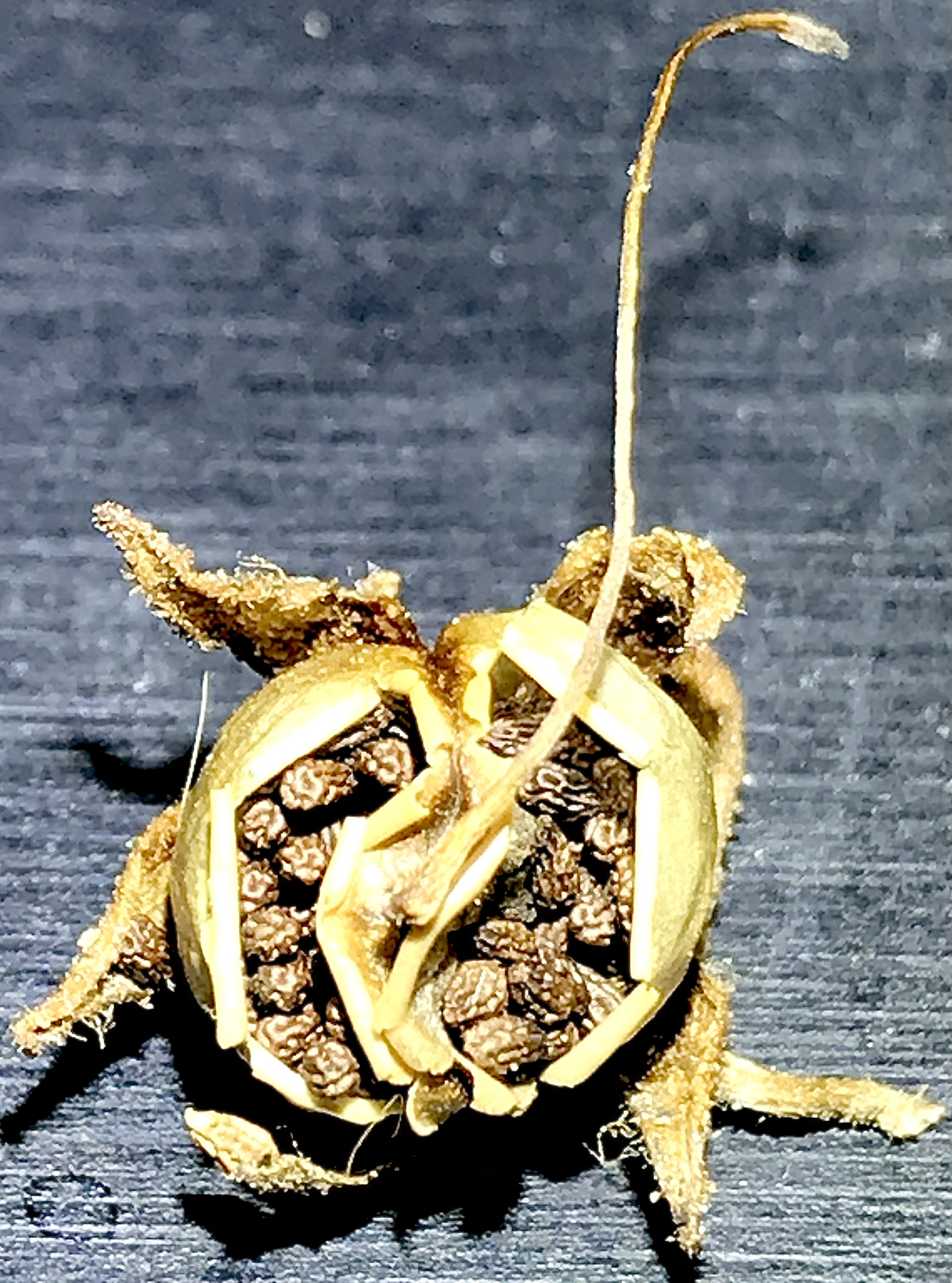
Perfectly dehisced capsule detached to show three valves, central one bearing dry, persistent pistil
