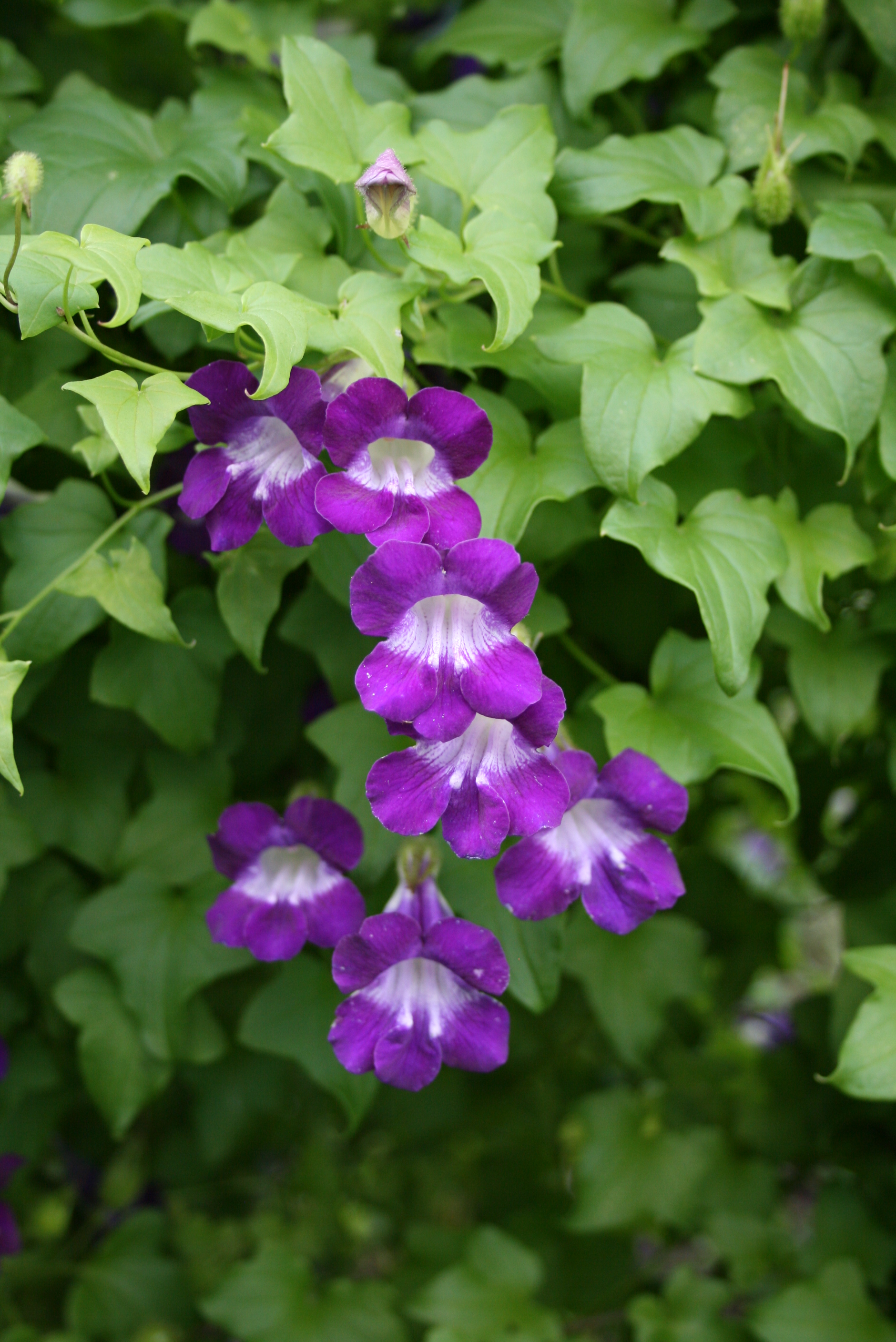
- Maurandya barclayana

Scientific classification
- Kingdom: Plantae
- Clade: Tracheophytes
- Clade: Angiosperms
- Clade: Eudicots
- Clade: Asterids
- Order: Lamiales
- Family: Plantaginaceae
- Tribe: Antirrhineae
- Genus: Maurandya; Ortega

Species
- See text

Synonyms
- Reichardia Roth 1800

= Maurandya =

Genus of flowering plants

Maurandya is a genus of flowering plants in the family Plantaginaceae, native to Mexico and the south west United States (from California to central Texas). They sprawl or climb by means of twining leaf stalks. One of the four species, Maurandya barclayana, is widely cultivated as an ornamental plant.

The generic name is often misspelt as Maurandia. Two of its species have at times been placed in the genera Epixiphium and Maurandella.

== Description ==
The species of Maurandya are either herbaceous perennials with fibrous roots or, in the case of M. wislizeni, an annual with a tap root. All are sprawlers or climbers, climbing by means of twining leaf stalks (petioles). The leaves are shaped like broad or narrow arrowheads, more rarely heart-shaped.

The flower stalks (peduncles) grow upwards and bear solitary flowers. The more-or-less triangular sepals are not joined together but jointly form an urn-shaped structure around the base of the flower. The petals (collectively the corolla) are joined at the base to form a tube with five free lobes at the tip. The lobes are differentiated into two upper ones, usually curving backwards, and three lower ones, usually pointing forwards. The corolla is whitish at the base with various colours further on: pink, red, violet, blue or combinations of these. In M. antirrhiniflora, the flowers have two "lips" partly enclosing the throat or tube of the flower; in the other species, the flower tube is open.

There are four fertile stamens, two of one length and two of another, plus a rudimentary sterile stamen. The stamens and style are included in the flower. After fertilization, a two-valved capsule forms, of various shapes, containing dark brown seeds.

== Taxonomy ==
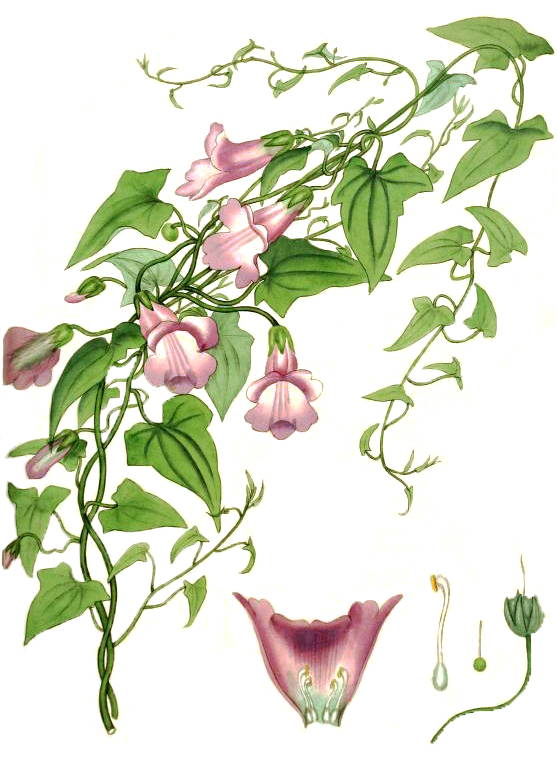
Maurandya scandens from The Botanist's Repository, 1797

Maurandya scandens was the first species of the genus to be described for science, by Antonio José Cavanilles in 1793, based on plants being grown in Spain. He named the species Usteria scandens. However, the generic name Usteria had already been used in 1790, so was illegitimate. In 1797, Casimiro Gómez Ortega provided the legitimate generic name, Maurandya. A year later, Nikolaus Joseph von Jacquin published the orthographic variant (i.e. misspelling) Maurandia. The generic name Maurandya honours Catherina Pancratia Maurandy, the wife of a Spanish professor of botany, described by Ortega as the partner (socia) of his botanical labours. (Note: Elisens says that Catherine Maurandy was the Professor of Botany rather than her husband, but this is incorrect, as is also confirmed by Pennell.)

The genus is placed in the tribe Antirrhineae; within this tribe, it is closely related to Lophospermum, Mabrya and Rhodochiton. Both Lophospermum and Rhodochiton have been included in Maurandya as sections; Mabrya was split off from Maurandya by Wayne J. Elisens. Scientific names within these genera have been confused; for example, an image accepted by Tropicos as Lophospermum erubescens bears the caption Maurandya barclaiana (a variant spelling of Maurandya barclayana).

=== Phylogeny ===
A number of molecular phylogenetic studies have shown that subtribe Maurandyinae, defined by Elisen to consist of the five North American genera Holmgrenanthe, Lophospermum, Mabrya, Maurandya and Rhodochiton, forms a monophyletic group, which is related to the Old World genera Cymbalaria and Asarina. Gehebrehiwet et al. suggested that the Maurandyinae could be expanded to include Cymbalaria and Asarina. Vargas et al. presented the following cladogram in 2013:

- Antirrhineae
  - other clades
  - - Cymbalaria lineage
      - - Asarina
        - Cymbalaria
      - Maurandyinae sensu Elisens
        - Maurandya (including M. antirrhiniflora)
        - - Rhodochiton
          - - Lophospermum
            - Mabrya

Vargas et al. concluded that the Antirrhineae evolved in the Old World and subsequently colonized North America more than once, probably in the Miocene epoch (23 to 5 million years ago). One such colonization led to the evolution of the Maurandyinae (in Elisen's sense).

=== Species ===
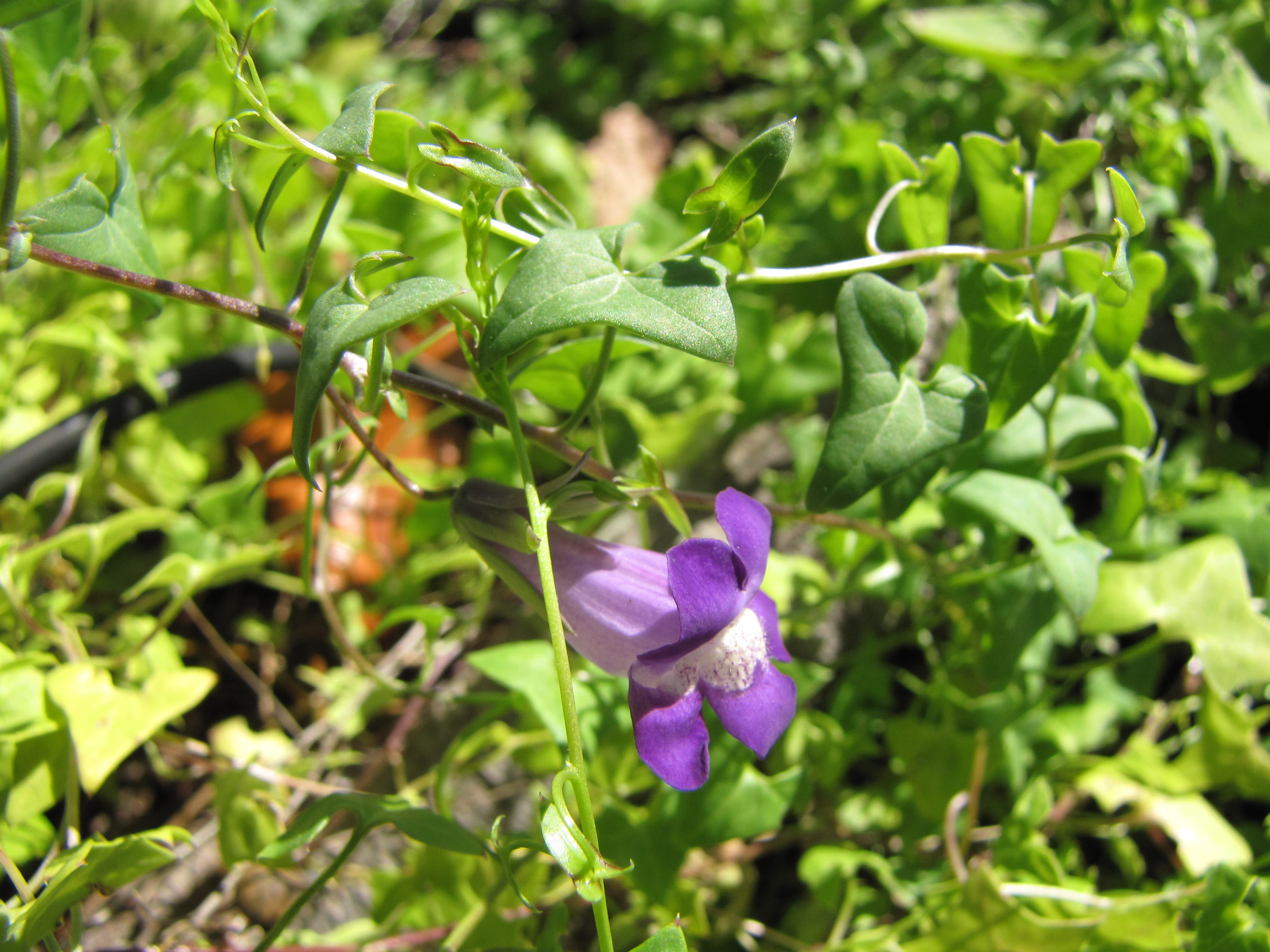
Maurandya antirrhiniflora, in cultivation

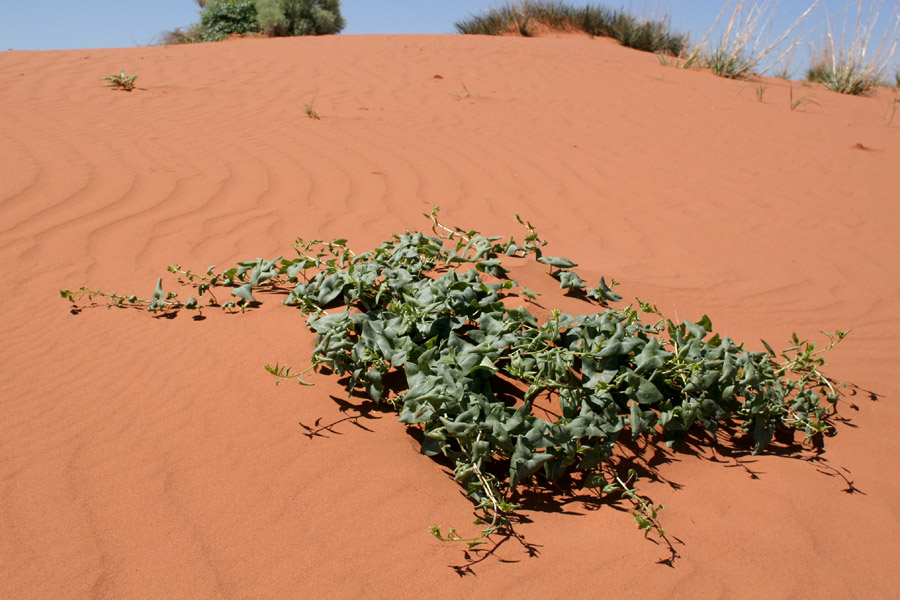
Maurandya wislizeni in its natural habitat

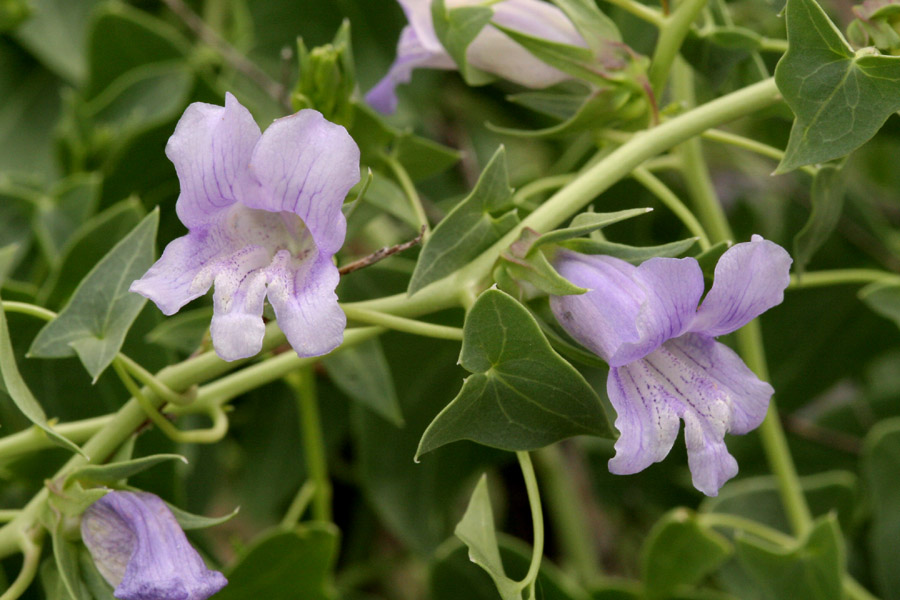
Maurandya wislizeni

As of July 2014, four species are accepted: (Note: Version 1.1 of The Plant List lists a further five species as "Accepted". However, in each case a synonym of the name is present in the database with the same status. For example, Maurandya acerifolia Pennell and Mabrya acerifolia (Pennell) Elisens are both said to be "Accepted".)

- Maurandya antirrhiniflora Humb. & Bonpl. ex Willd. (syn. Maurandella antirrhiniflora (Humb. & Bonpl. ex Willd.) Rothm.)
- Maurandya barclayana Lindl.
- Maurandya scandens (Cav.) Pers.
- Maurandya wislizeni Engelm. ex A.Gray (syn. Epixiphium wislizeni (Engelm. ex A.Gray) Munz)

The partially closed flowers of M. antirrhiniflora compared to the open flowers of the other species have been a factor in some authorities putting it into a separate genus, Maurandella (or at least into a different section within Maurandya). Elisens does not consider the differences sufficient to warrant such a move.

M. wislizeni is somewhat different from the other species; for example, it is the only annual growing from a tap root. Some authorities have put it into a separate genus, Epixiphium, or in a separate section within Maurandya. This has been rejected by Elisens in his monograph on the subtribe to which Maurandya belongs, on the grounds that the overall similarities "indicate a close relationship among the four species". He does however place this species in a separate subgenus, M. subgenus Epixiphium, with the other three species in M. subgenus Maurandya.

=== Formerly placed here ===
A number of species formerly in Maurandya were put into a new genus, Mabrya, by Elisens and by David A. Sutton:

- Maurandya acerifolia Pennell = Mabrya acerifolia (Pennell) Elisens
- Maurandya coccinea I.M.Johnst. = Mabrya coccinea (I.M.Johnst.) Elisens
- Maurandya erecta Hemsl. = Mabrya erecta (Hemsl.) Elisens
- Maurandya flaviflora I.M.Johnst. = Mabrya flaviflora (I.M.Johnst.) D.A.Sutton
- Maurandya geniculata B.L.Rob. & Fernald = Mabrya geniculata (B.L.Rob. & Fernald) Elisens
- Maurandya rosei Munz = Mabrya rosei (Munz) Elisens

Other species that have been placed in Maurandya include:

- Maurandya atrosanguinea (Zucc.) G.Nicholson = Rhodochiton atrosanguineus (Zucc.) Rothm.
- Maurandya erubescens (D.Don) A.Gray = Lophospermum erubescens D.Don
- Maurandya juncea Benth. = Gambelia juncea (Benth.) D.A.Sutton
- Maurandya lophospermum L.H.Bailey (syn. M. scandens (D.Don) A.Gray, nom. superfl., not M. scandens (Cav.) Pers.) = Lophospermum scandens D.Don
- Maurandya petrophila Coville & C.V.Morton = Holmgrenanthe petrophila (Coville & C.V.Morton) Elisens
- Maurandya purpusii Brandegee = Lophospermum purpusii (Brandegee) Rothm.

== Distribution and habitat ==
Distribution of Maurandya species

Maurandya species are native to Mexico and the south west United States (from California through Arizona and New Mexico to central Texas). The most widespread, M. antirrhiniflora, occurs in a wide range of habitats, from sandy coastal soils to calcareous rocky areas and from sea level to 2,600 m (8,500 ft). The other three species are somewhat more restricted in habitat. M. wislizeni is an annual found in the Chihuahuan Desert. M. barclayana and M. scandens generally grow in mountainous regions of Mexico, from 1,500 to 2,400 m (4,900 to 7,900 ft).

Some species of Maurandya have escaped cultivation and become naturalized, including M. antirrhiniflora in Hawaii and Florida.

== Ecology ==
Maurandya antirrhiniflora and M. barclayana are known to be pollinated by long-tongued bees, defined as those with tongues more than 6 mm (0.2 in) long. Species pollinated in this way typically have white, blue or violet flowers with floral tubes around 13–35 mm (0.5–1.4 in) long. The pollinator of M. wislizeni is unknown, but its flower colour and shape are similar, suggesting it too is pollinated by long-tongued bees. M. scandens has flowers of a similar size and shape, but of a reddish-pink colour, normally associated with pollination by hummingbirds. It may have recently evolved from a bee-pollinated ancestor.

== Cultivation ==
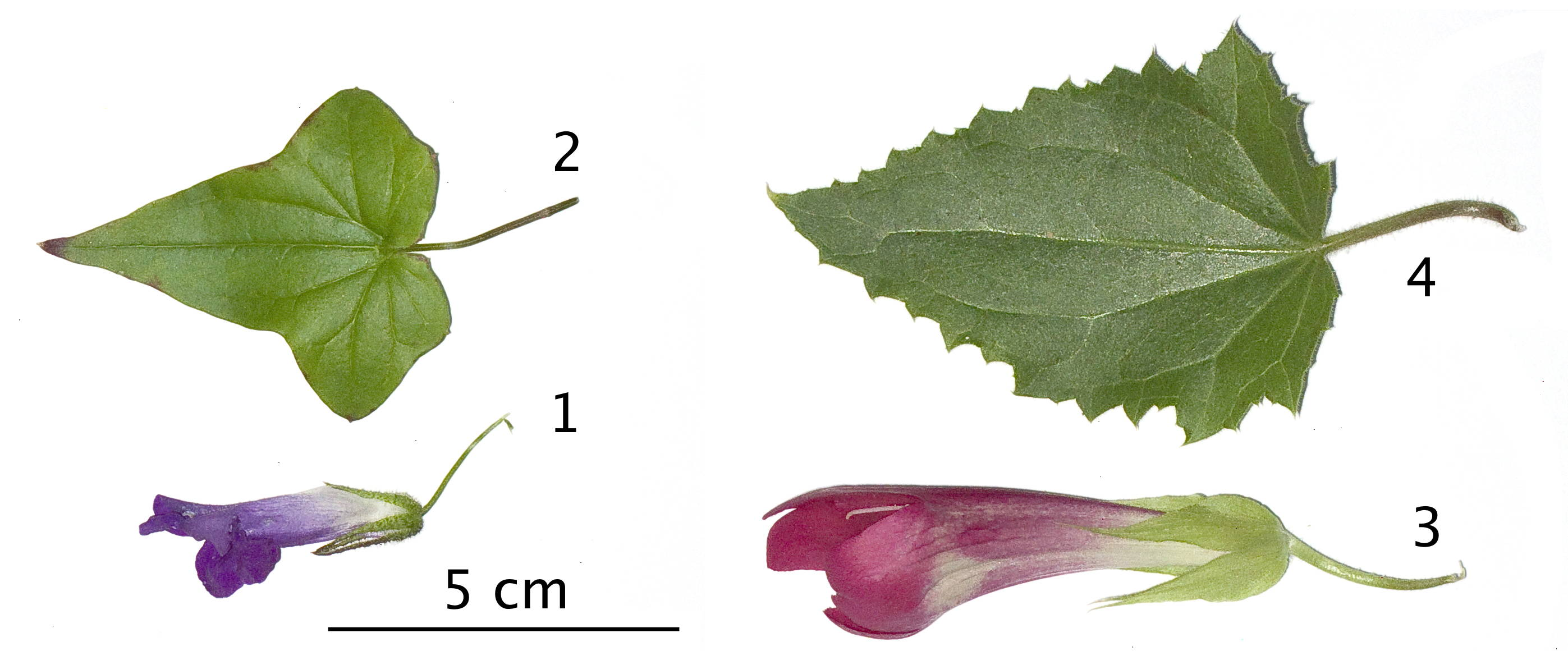
Comparison of Maurandya barclayana with Lophospermum scandens: – Maurandya flower (1) is shorter with narrower sepals than Lophospermum flower (3) – Maurandya leaf (2) is smooth with entire (untoothed) margins; Lophospermum leaf (4) is somewhat hairy with toothed margins.

Maurandya barclayana has been cultivated as an ornamental climber since at least the 19th century. It was introduced into England in 1825 by Mr. Barclay, a London brewer. The Horticultural Society of London named it in honour of Dr. Maurandy, a botanical professor, at Carthegena, and Barclayana, in honour of the man who introduced it to England. Joseph Paxton described its cultivation in 1836, saying that it was a "beautiful climber". Elisens described it as "a particularly attractive hanging or climbing plant". Maurandya scandens is also commonly cultivated and has escaped to grow in the wild. The two species can cross when grown together.

As noted above, Maurandya and Lophospermum species have regularly been confused, particularly in cultivation. Cultivated species of Maurandya have shorter flowers than those of Lophospermum and leaves with entire rather than toothed margins.

Plants may be grown from seed and treated as annuals. In frost-free climates, or where the roots can be protected from frost, plants may be perennial, regrowing from the base after dying back in the winter. M. barclayana is said to be hardy to −5 °C (23 °F).
