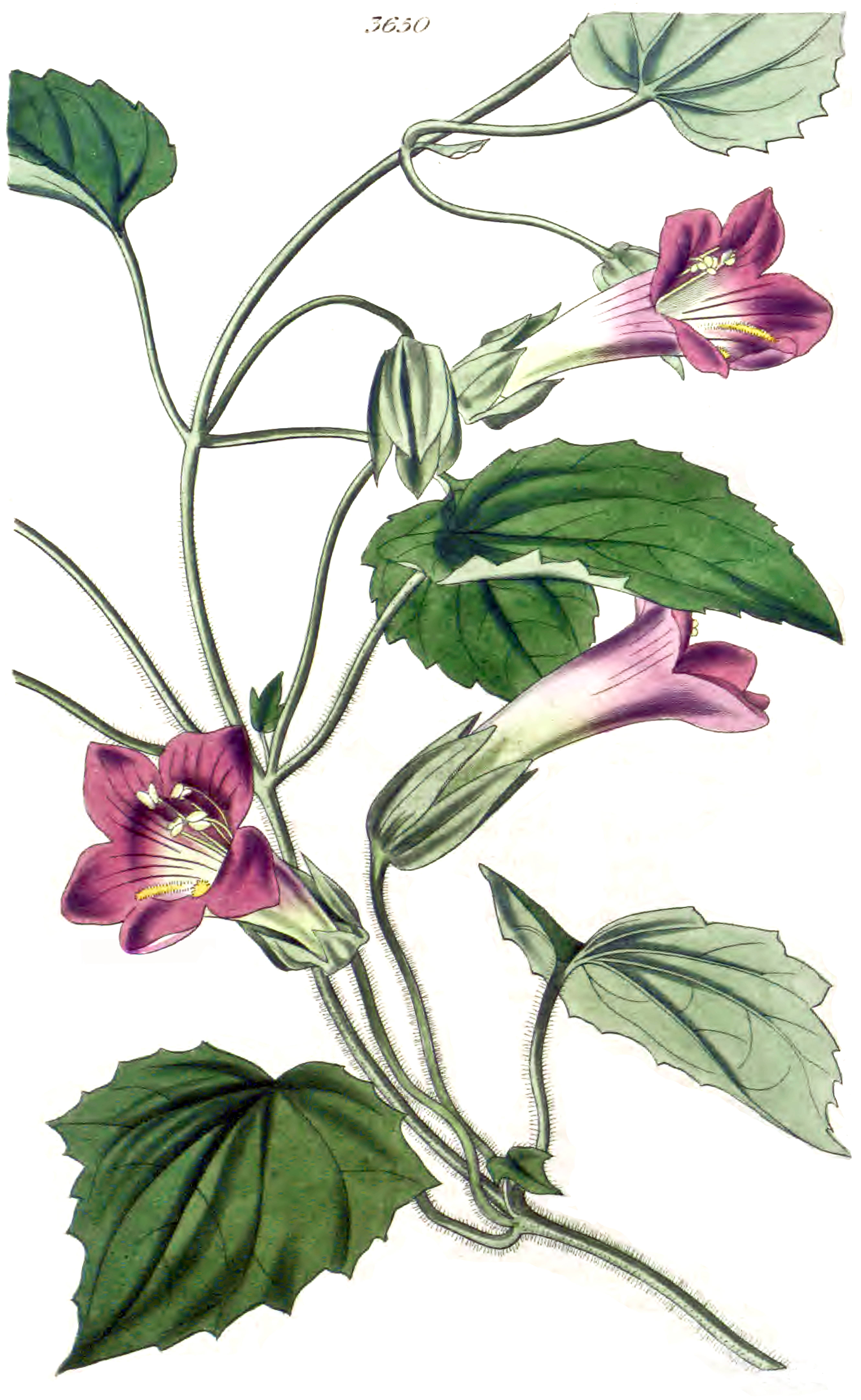
- Plate from Curtis's Botanical Magazine (1839)

Scientific classification
- Kingdom: Plantae
- Clade: Tracheophytes
- Clade: Angiosperms
- Clade: Eudicots
- Clade: Asterids
- Order: Lamiales
- Family: Plantaginaceae
- Genus: Lophospermum
- Species: L. scandens

Binomial name
- Lophospermum scandens D.Don

Synonyms
- Maurandya scandens (D. Don) A.Gray, non Maurandya scandens (Cav.) Pers.; Maurandya scandens var. glabrior Voss; Maurandya lophospermum L.H.Bailey; Asarina lophospermum (L.H.Bailey) Pennell; Maurandya erubescens var. glabrata I.M.Johnst.; Maurandya glabrata (I.M.Johnst.) Ramírez, nom. superfl.

= Lophospermum scandens =

Species of flowering plant

Lophospermum scandens is a scambling or climbing herbaceous perennial native to south central Mexico, with red-violet and white tubular flowers and toothed heart-shaped leaves. It grows at elevations between 1,400 and 2,400 m (4,600 and 7,900 ft) in dry habitats, including deciduous oak forests and recent lava flows. The long-tubed flowers are pollinated by hummingbirds. It has been used in gardens as an ornamental plant since the mid-19th century. Its roots require protection from frost in regions where this occurs in the winter. Hybrids of L. scandens are also grown.

Lophospermum scandens has been confused with Lophospermum erubescens, partly because the earliest illustration of L. erubescens was labelled as L. scandens. Among other differences, L. scandens has a less climbing habit than L. erubescens, with few twining leaf stalks; also the sepals are narrower and joined at the base for 7–11 mm (0.3–0.4 in) rather than only 2–3 mm (0.08–0.12 in).

In horticulture it often appears under the genus names Maurandya and Asarina, although these genera are now regarded as distinct from Lophospermum. The true Maurandya scandens is a different species, with shorter flowers and smaller leaves without distinct marginal teeth.

== Description ==
Lophospermum scandens is a sprawling or climbing herbaceous perennial with fibrous roots. The long stems are branched, becoming woody at the base with age and developing a woody caudex – a swollen, bulb-like structure at the base of the stem. The leaf stalks (petioles) are 30–50 mm (1.2–2.0 in) long, occasionally twining to grasp supports, thus enabling the plant to climb. The leaves are narrowly heart-shaped, 30–110 mm (1.2–4.3 in) long by 16–54 mm (0.6–2.1 in) wide, with a pointed apex and toothed edges (dentate or crenate). The leaves and stems are sparsely covered with short hairs.

Lophospermum scandens flowers and fruits from May to November in its native habitat. The flowers are borne singly on stems (peduncles) 30–56 mm (1.2–2.2 in) long. The calyx has sepals that are generally narrowly ovate, 23–35 mm (0.9–1.4 in) long and 7–10 mm (0.3–0.4 in) wide at the base, joined for the first 7–11 mm (0.3–0.4 in). The upper three sepals are somewhat longer than the lower two. The lower margin of the sepals curves outwards along about a third or half its length. The flowers have five petals, joined at the base to form a tube 42–47 mm (1.7–1.9 in) long, whitish at the base and pinkish-red to reddish-violet towards the end. The free lobes at the end of the petals are in two sets: the lower three are shorter, 10–13 mm (0.4–0.5 in) long; the upper two are longer, 14–17 mm (0.6–0.7 in) long, joined to each other for about two thirds their length. Two prominent folds (plicae) run along the length of the base of the flower tube, bearing numerous yellow hairs less than 1 mm (0.04 in) long. There are four fertile stamens, the upper two slightly longer than the lower two, and one rudimentary infertile stamen. The style has a cone-shaped lobed stigma.

The ovary is hairless and has two chambers (locules). After fertilization, an unsymmetrical ovoid capsule forms, filled with brown seeds, each with a circular "wing" around it.

== Taxonomy ==
Lophospermum scandens was first collected by Martín Sessé and José Mariano Mociño, probably in 1789 during a scientific expedition in what is now Mexico but was then New Spain. They called it Besleria scandens, although the name was not formally published. David Don first published the name Lophospermum scandens in 1827, creating the new genus Lophospermum for this species, which he described as "truly a most magnificent plant".

Lophospermum scandens has also been confused with Lophospermum erubescens. An illustration of a Lophospermum species was published in 1830 in The British Flower Garden and at first identified as L. scandens. David Don later realized that it was a new species, and corrected the error in a subsequent note in The British Flower Garden, giving the illustrated plant the new name L. erubescens. Don's correction was not always noticed, with the result that the name L. scandens became associated with the illustration of L. erubescens. Some differences between the two species are that L. scandens has a less climbing habit than L. erubescens, with fewer twining leaf stalks; the bases of the sepals are joined for 7–11 mm (0.3–0.4 in) rather than for only 2–3 mm (0.08–0.12 in); and the folds (plicae) on the base of the inside of the flower tube bear hairs less than 1 mm (0.04 in) long rather than 1–2 mm (0.04–0.08 in) long.

In 1868, Asa Gray created nomenclatural confusion when he decided that Lophospermum should be merged into Maurandya. The name Maurandya scandens (Cav.) Pers. had already been published for an existing species in the genus Maurandya, so in transferring L. scandens into Maurandya as M. scandens (D.Don) A.Gray, Gray inadvertently created a name associated with two species. (Inadvertently because Gray used the illegitimate name M. semperflorens for M. scandens (Cav.) Pers.) Wayne J. Elisens in his 1985 monograph considered Lophospermum and Maurandya to be distinct genera, a view since confirmed by molecular phylogenetic studies.

As well as being placed in Maurandya under various names, Lophospermum scandens was also placed in Asarina by Francis Whittier Pennell, as Asarina lophospermum.

== Distribution and habitat ==
Lophospermum scandens is native to south central Mexico, in the states of Mexico, Morelos and Guerrero, where it is found at elevations between 1,400 and 2,400 m (4,600 and 7,900 ft), often on soils of volcanic origin. It grows in deciduous oak forests and scrub, on cliffs, canyon walls, and rocky outcrops, including recent lava flows, in dry habitats.

== Ecology ==
Lophospermum scandens is pollinated by hummingbirds. It shows characteristic adaptations to this mode of pollination, having long-tubed flowers in shades of red with open throats. The nectar produced by the flowers is typical of those pollinated by hummingbirds, being high in sucrose and low in glucose relative to fructose.

== Cultivation ==
Lophospermum scandens was described in cultivation in the Liverpool Botanic Garden in 1836, where it was trained against a south wall. Its roots were protected over the winter by being covered with dry peaty soil. It was described as a "truly magnificent" climbing plant with the advantage of producing a succession of flowers over the summer. In 1839, it was described as "easily cultivated, either in the open air or in the greenhouse".

In horticulture, it is often given names in the genus Maurandya, as listed for example in the RHS Horticultural Database. Lophospermum and Maurandya are now regarded as distinct. Maurandya has smooth rather than hairy leaves with entire rather than toothed margins, and smaller flowers with a tube at most about 30 mm (1.2 in) long. As noted above, the name Maurandya scandens is a source of confusion, since M. scandens (D.Don) A.Gray is a synonym of Lophospermum scandens, whereas M. scandens (Cav.) Pers. is an entirely different plant. Thus if the authority is not given, the identity of a plant described as "Maurandya scandens" is unclear. Lophospermum scandens is also known in cultivation by its synonym Asarina lophospermum; for example a US plant patent describes hybrids between L. scandens and L. erubescens as Asarina lophospermum × Asarina erubescens. Asarina is now regarded as an purely European genus.

The cultivation of the true Lophospermum scandens is described as similar to that of other species of Lophospermum and of species of Maurandya. Plants need to be protected from the frost over the winter. Propagation is by seed or cuttings.
