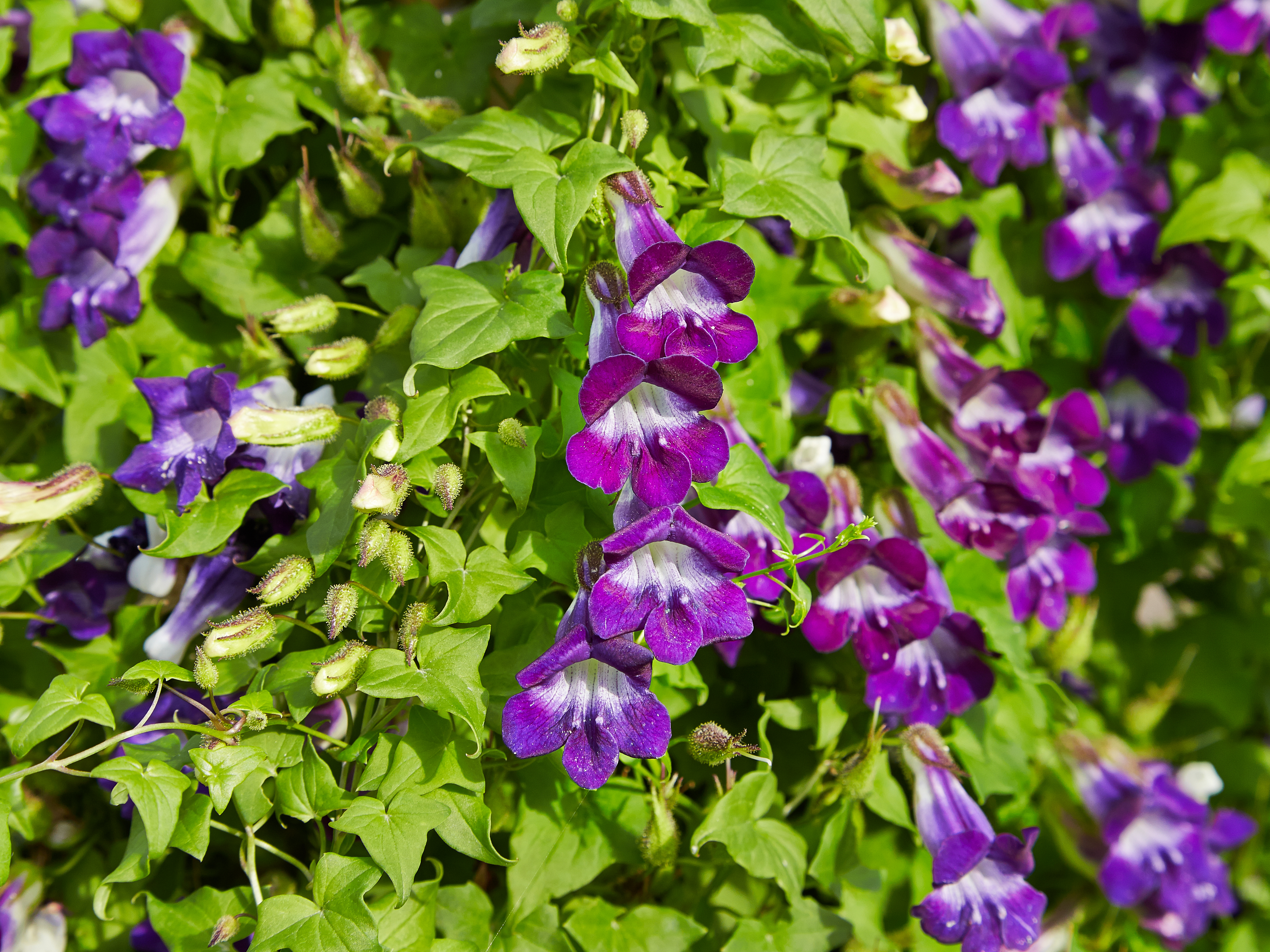

Scientific classification
- Kingdom: Plantae
- Clade: Tracheophytes
- Clade: Angiosperms
- Clade: Eudicots
- Clade: Asterids
- Order: Lamiales
- Family: Plantaginaceae
- Genus: Maurandya
- Species: M. barclayana

Binomial name
- Maurandya barclayana Lindl.

= Maurandya barclayana =

Species of flowering plant

Maurandya barclayana (syn. Asarina barclayana; orth. var. M. barclaiana), commonly called angels trumpet or Mexican viper, is an ornamental plant in the family Plantaginaceae native to Mexico.

This plant is cited in The movements and habits of climbing plants by Charles Darwin.

== Description ==
Growing to 4 m (13 ft) in height, this herbaceous perennial climber has ivy-like leaves and white, pink or purple tubular flowers that occur in spring and summer.

It is a climbing, fibrous-rooted perennial with stems usually having adventitious roots. Its lamina leaves that are triangular-cordate or triangular-hastate, 1–3.5 cm in length and 8–30 mm wide. The apex is acute to attenuate. Basal lobes are acute or undiscerning, with some margins, and small teeth towards the base. It is palmately veined and has a petiole that is 1–1.5 cm long.

=== Inflorescences ===
Peduncles are 2–5 cm long. Sepals are long and simple, which are 10–15 mm long in flower and 20 mm long in fruit. Corolla is 3–4.5 cm long, purple in colour, and is lighter near the base. The lobes are shorter than the tube.

== Cultivation ==
Since it does not tolerate frost, in cooler temperate climates it is often grown under glass in a conservatory, or alternatively as a tender annual. It requires a sheltered position in full sun. It has gained the Royal Horticultural Society's Award of Garden Merit. It can be propagated by seed or by softwood cuttings.

== Sources ==
- Pink, A. (2004). Gardening for the Million. Project Gutenberg Literary Archive Foundation.
