= Mabrya coccinea =

Scientific classification
- Kingdom: Plantae
- Clade: Tracheophytes
- Clade: Angiosperms
- Clade: Eudicots
- Clade: Asterids
- Order: Lamiales
- Family: Plantaginaceae
- Genus: Mabrya
- Species: M. coccinea

Binomial name
- Mabrya coccinea (I.M.Johnst.) Elisens

Synonyms
- Maurandya coccinea I.M.Johnst.

Species of flowering plant

Mabrya coccinea is a mat-forming herbaceous perennial native to the Mexican state of Coahuila. It has red tubular flowers. It was first described by Ivan M. Johnston in 1950 in the genus Maurandya and transferred to Mabrya by Wayne J. Elisens in 1985. The epithet coccinea means red.
