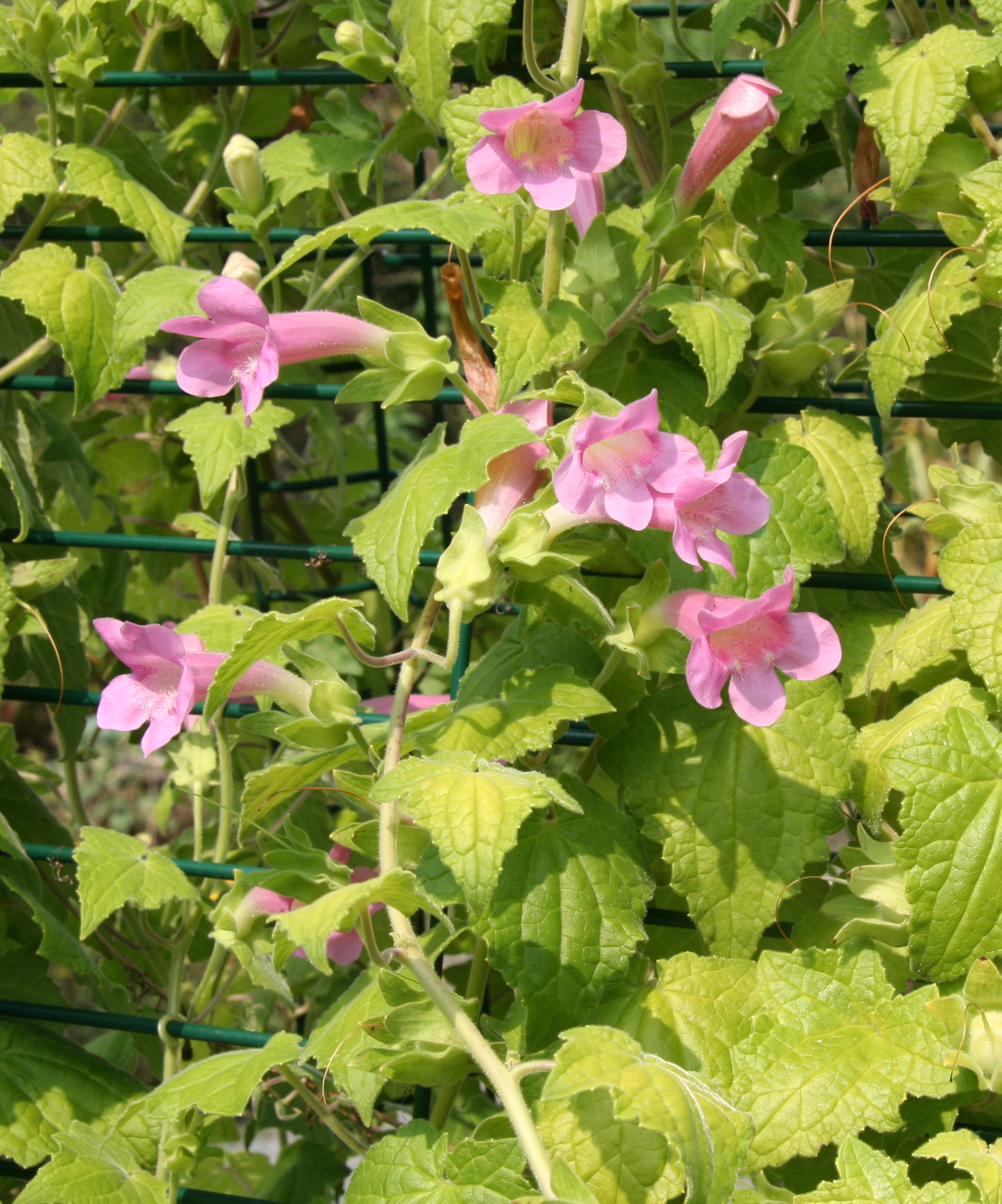
- In cultivation

Scientific classification
- Kingdom: Plantae
- Clade: Tracheophytes
- Clade: Angiosperms
- Clade: Eudicots
- Clade: Asterids
- Order: Lamiales
- Family: Plantaginaceae
- Genus: Lophospermum
- Species: L. erubescens

Binomial name
- Lophospermum erubescens D.Don

Synonyms
- Asarina erubescens (D.Don) Pennell; Maurandya erubescens (D.Don) A.Gray; Maurandya erubescens var. purpusii I.M.Johnst.; Maurandya scandens var. erubescens (D.Don) Voss; Maurandya scandens var. spectabilis Voss

= Lophospermum erubescens =

Species of flowering plant

Lophospermum erubescens, known as Mexican twist or creeping gloxinia, is a climbing or sprawling herbaceous perennial plant, native to the Sierra Madre Oriental mountains of Mexico, where it is found along forest margins or canyon walls. It climbs by means of twining leaf stalks. Wild plants have pink and white tubular flowers, although other colours are found in cultivation. It has been cultivated as an ornamental plant since at least 1830. Although not frost-hardy, it will survive if its base and roots are protected from freezing in the winter. It has escaped from cultivation and become naturalized in tropical and subtropical areas of the world.

Lophospermum erubescens has been confused with Lophospermum scandens, partly because the earliest illustration of L. erubescens was labelled as L. scandens. Among other differences, L. erubescens has a more climbing habit than L. scandens, with many twining leaf stalks; also the sepals are broader and joined at the base for only 2–3 mm (0.08–0.12 in) rather than 7–11 mm (0.3–0.4 in).

Despite the common name creeping gloxinia, it is not closely related to either the true Gloxinia species from South America, or the flowering houseplant commonly known as gloxinia, Sinningia speciosa.

== Description ==
Lophospermum erubescens is a climbing herbaceous perennial with fibrous roots. It climbs by means of twining leaf stalks (petioles) rather than tendrils or twining stems. The long stems are branched, becoming woody at the base with age and developing a woody caudex – a swollen, bulb-like structure at the base of the stem. The leaves have petioles 30–65 mm (1.2–2.6 in) long and are triangular or heart-shaped, 45–153 mm (1.8–6.0 in) long by 45–50 mm (1.8–2.0 in) wide, with a pointed apex and toothed edges (dentate or crenate). The leaves and stems are sparsely covered with short hairs.

Lophospermum erubescens flowers and fruits over a long period, April to the following January in its native habitat. The flowers are borne singly. The calyx has sepals that are broadly ovate, 19–26 mm (0.7–1.0 in) long and 9–15 mm (0.4–0.6 in) wide at the base, joined only for the first 2–3 mm (0.08–0.12 in). The sepal margins curve outwards along about a third or half their length. The flowers have five petals, joined at the base to form a tube 48–63 mm (1.9–2.5 in) long, whitish at the base and pinkish-red to red towards the end. The free lobes at the end of the petals bend outwards. There are two prominent folds (plicae) running along the length of the base of the flower tube, bearing numerous yellow hairs 1–2 mm (0.04–0.08 in) long. There are four fertile stamens, the upper two slightly longer than the lower two, and one rudimentary infertile stamen. The style has a forked stigma.

The ovary is covered with glandular hairs and has two chambers (locules). After fertilization, a more-or-less symmetrical globe-shaped capsule forms, filled with brown seeds, each with a circular "wing" around it.

== Taxonomy ==
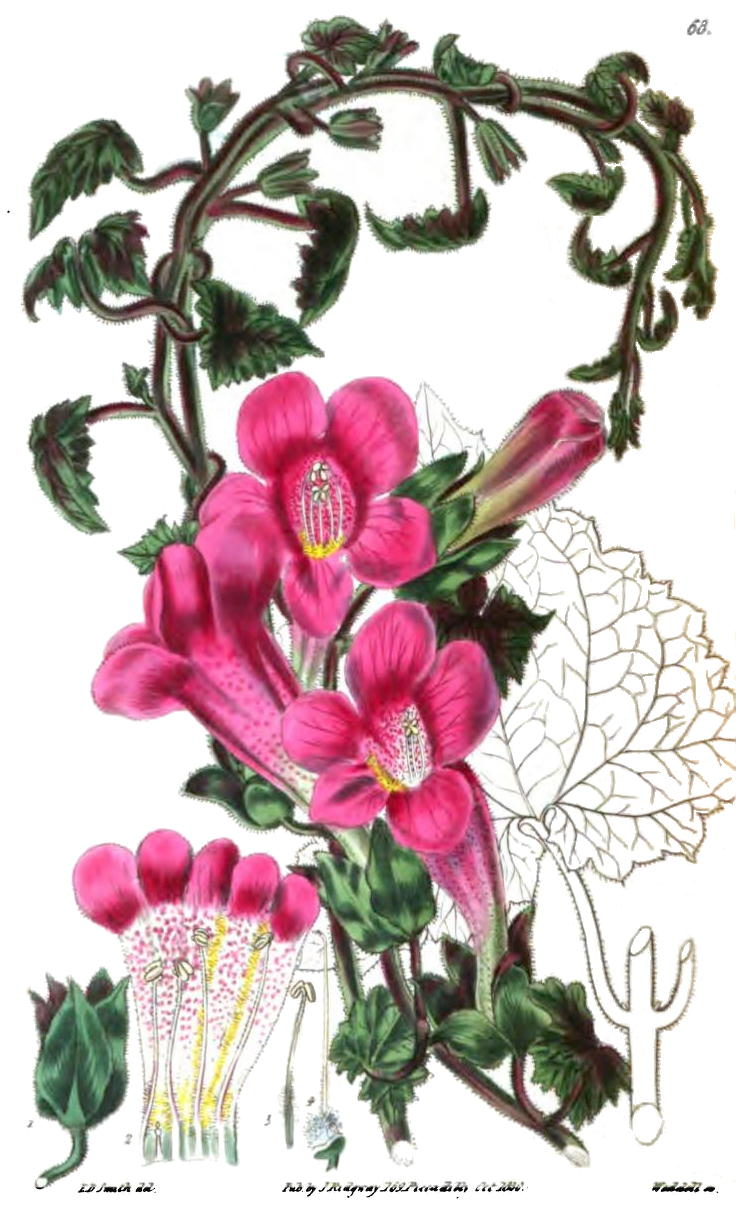
Earliest illustration of Lophospermum erubescens

The earliest illustration of Lophospermum erubescens appeared in 1830 in The British Flower Garden. The plant was at first identified as the already known Lophospermum scandens and labelled as such. David Don later realized that it was a new species, and corrected the error in a subsequent note in The British Flower Garden, describing the illustrated plant as a new species, L. erubescens. Don did not explain the origin of the specific epithet, but erubescens means reddening or blushing in Latin. Don's correction was not always noticed, with the result that the name L. scandens became associated with the illustration of L. erubescens, creating confusion between the two species.

The distinction between the two species has not always been accepted. Don distinguished L. erubescens from L. scandens by features such as the former's more triangular leaves with shorter hairs, and broader, less sharply pointed sepals. Other differences are that L. erubescens has a more climbing habit than L. scandens, with many twining leaf stalks; the bases of the sepals are joined for only 2–3 mm (0.08–0.12 in) rather than 7–11 mm (0.3–0.4 in); and the folds (plicae) on the base of the inside of the flower tube bear hairs 1–2 mm (0.04–0.08 in) rather than less than 1 mm (0.04 in) long.

Lophospermum erubescens has previously been placed in other genera now considered distinct but related; for example in Maurandya by Samuel Frederick Gray and in Asarina by Francis Whittier Pennell.

== Distribution and habitat ==
Lophospermum erubescens is native to the Sierra Madre Oriental mountains of Mexico where it is found at elevations between 1,000 and 2,200 m (3,300 and 7,200 ft). It grows in the margins of seasonally dry oak or oak-Liquidambar forests, including forest edges created by roads, or on canyon walls.

Through its widespread cultivation, it has become naturalized in many tropical and subtropical areas of the world, including Central America (Costa Rica and Panama), the Caribbean (Puerto Rico and Jamaica), South America (Venezuela, Colombia, Ecuador, Peru and southern Brazil), Hawaii, the Azores, Madeira, Madagascar and Réunion, Australia (New South Wales and Queensland), New Zealand (North Island), New Caledonia, Java and New Guinea.

== Ecology ==
Lophospermum erubescens is pollinated by hummingbirds. Its flowers show characteristic adaptations to this mode of pollination, having sturdy, long-tubed pink to red flowers with open throats, that are more-or-less radially symmetrical. The nectar produced by the flowers is also typical of those pollinated by hummingbirds, being high in sucrose and low in glucose relative to fructose.

== Cultivation ==
Lophospermum erubescens has been in cultivation since it was first formally described in 1830. Joseph Paxton wrote in 1836 that it was "a very fine creeper, and deserves growing by every lover of plants." Growing to 2 m (7 ft) or more, it has been described as "easy" to grow in a frost-free location. In areas subject to frost, it will survive if cut down to near ground level and the base and roots protected from freezing over winter. Propagation is by seed or cuttings. In cultivation, forms with all-white flowers are known, including the cultivar 'Bridal Bouquet'.

In horticulture, it is often given names in the genus Maurandya, as noted for example in the RHS Horticultural Database. However, Lophospermum and Maurandya are now regarded as distinct. Maurandya has smooth rather than hairy leaves with entire rather than toothed margins, and smaller flowers with a tube at most about 30 mm (1.2 in) long.

This plant has won the Royal Horticultural Society's Award of Garden Merit.
