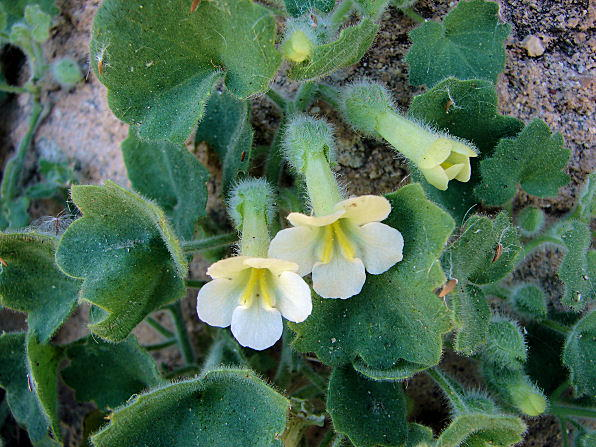
- Mabrya acerifolia

Scientific classification
- Kingdom: Plantae
- Clade: Tracheophytes
- Clade: Angiosperms
- Clade: Eudicots
- Clade: Asterids
- Order: Lamiales
- Family: Plantaginaceae
- Tribe: Antirrhineae
- Genus: Mabrya; Elisens

Species
- See text

= Mabrya =

Genus of flowering plants

Mabrya is a genus of flowering plants in the plantain family, Plantaginaceae. It consists of herbaceous perennials with brittle upright or drooping stems, found in dry areas of Mexico and the southern United States.

== Description ==
Species of Mabrya are herbaceous perennials with fibrous roots. They have brittle stems, usually pendant and forming mats, although more upright in M. erecta. The stems branch and become woody at the base with age. Unlike related genera, such as Maurandya and Lophospermum, the leaf stalks (petioles) are straight and do not twine. The leaves are rounded or kidney shaped, generally with broad, somewhat rounded teeth.

The flowers are borne individually on stalks (peduncles) that are usually horizontal or ascending. The sepals are joined at the base; where their margins become free, they curve back on themselves. Together the sepals form an urn-shaped calyx. The flowers consist of five petals joined at the base to form a tube. The free lobes of the petals are differentiated into two upper ones that curve backwards and three lower ones that either point forward or also curve backward. The flower tends to be whitish at the base and is then cream, yellow, pink, red or reddish violet. There are four fertile stamens, of two different lengths, and one rudimentary infertile stamen. The stamens and style are either held inside the flower or protrude. The stigma is forked. After fertilization, the two-chambered capsule contains tan or dark brown seeds.

== Taxonomy ==
The genus Mabrya was created by Wayne J. Elisens in 1985 to separate out a number of species previously placed in the genus Maurandya. The type species is Mabrya acerifolia. The generic name honours Tom J. Mabry for his contributions to phytochemistry and chemotaxonomy, which Elisens says "have substantially increased our understanding of the North American flora."

Mabrya is placed in the tribe Antirrhineae. The drooping or upright habit of the brittle stems distinguishes Mabrya (together with Holmgrenanthe) from the closely related genera Lophospermum, Maurandya and Rhodochiton, which have longer, flexible stems and climb by means of twining leaf stalks (petioles). The ovary of Mabrya is bilocular (i.e. has two compartments) unlike the unilocular ovary of Holmgrenanthe.

=== Phylogeny ===
A number of molecular phylogenetic studies have shown that subtribe Maurandyinae, defined by Elisen to consist of the five North American genera Holmgrenanthe, Lophospermum, Mabrya, Maurandya and Rhodochiton, forms a monophyletic group, which is related to the Old World genera Cymbalaria and Asarina. Gehebrehiwet et al. suggested that the Maurandyinae could be expanded to include Cymbalaria and Asarina. Vargas et al. presented the following cladogram in 2013:

- Antirrhineae
  - other clades
  - - Cymbalaria lineage
      - - Asarina
        - Cymbalaria
      - Maurandyinae sensu Elisens
        - Maurandya (including M. antirrhiniflora)
        - - Rhodochiton
          - - Lophospermum
            - Mabrya

Vargas et al. concluded that the Antirrhineae evolved in the Old World and subsequently colonized North America more than once, probably in the Miocene epoch (23 to 5 million years ago). One such colonization led to the evolution of the Maurandyinae (in Elisen's sense).

=== Species ===
As of July 2014, The Plant List accepts six species:

- Mabrya acerifolia (Pennell) Elisens
- Mabrya coccinea (I.M.Johnst.) Elisens
- Mabrya erecta (Hemsl.) Elisens
- Mabrya flaviflora (I.M.Johnst.) D.A.Sutton
- Mabrya geniculata (B.L.Rob. & Fernald) Elisens
- Mabrya rosei (Munz) Elisens

Elisens treated Mabrya flaviflora as a subspecies of Mabrya geniculata; it was later raised to a full species by David A. Sutton.

== Distribution and habitat ==
Distribution of Mabrya species

All the species are found in very dry areas, typically in shaded cliffs or canyons. Mabrya acerifolia is native to the Sonoran Desert in a small area about 80 km (50 miles) across in south central Arizona. All the other species are only found in Mexico, in the Sonoran Desert (M. geniculata and M. flaviflora, the latter only in Baja California Norte), the Chihuahuan Desert (M. coccinea and M. erecta) and in the states of Jalisco and Zacatecas (M. rosei).

== Ecology ==
Although observations of pollinators are limited, Elisens suggests that most Mabrya species are pollinated by hummingbirds; other possible pollinators are long-tongued bees. The nectar composition of most species resembles that of related species known to be hummingbird-pollinated, being high in sucrose and low in glucose compared to fructose.
