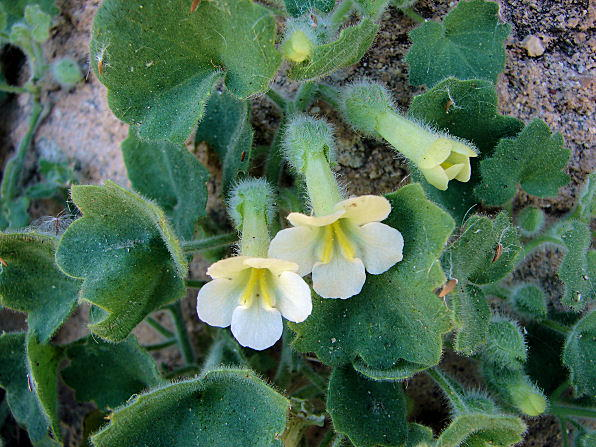

Scientific classification
- Kingdom: Plantae
- Clade: Tracheophytes
- Clade: Angiosperms
- Clade: Eudicots
- Clade: Asterids
- Order: Lamiales
- Family: Plantaginaceae
- Genus: Mabrya
- Species: M. acerifolia

Binomial name
- Mabrya acerifolia (Pennell) Elisens

Synonyms
- Maurandya acerifolia Pennell; Antirrhinum flaviflorum var. dentatum Tidestr.; Asarina acerifolia (Pennell) Pennell

= Mabrya acerifolia =

Species of flowering plant

Mabrya acerifolia, or brittlestem, is a mat-forming herbaceous perennial native to south-central Arizona. It has pale yellow tubular flowers. It was first described by Francis W. Pennell in 1924 in the genus Maurandya and transferred to Mabrya by Wayne J. Elisens in 1985. The epithet acerifolia refers to the somewhat maple-like shape of its leaves.

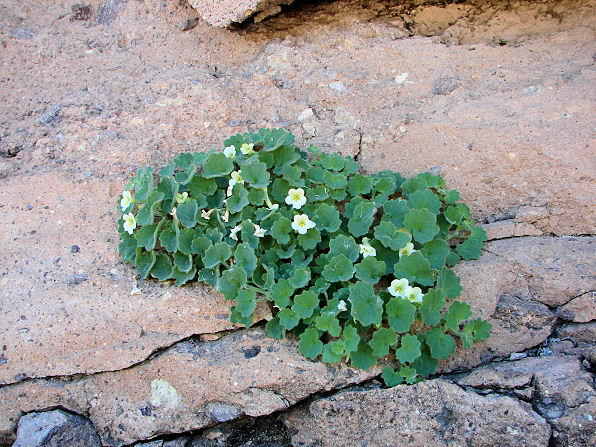
In habitat
