= Mabrya geniculata =

Scientific classification
- Kingdom: Plantae
- Clade: Tracheophytes
- Clade: Angiosperms
- Clade: Eudicots
- Clade: Asterids
- Order: Lamiales
- Family: Plantaginaceae
- Genus: Mabrya
- Species: M. geniculata

Binomial name
- Mabrya geniculata (B.L.Rob. & Fernald) Elisens

Subspecies
- M. g. subsp. geniculata M. g. subsp. lanata Elisens

Synonyms
- Maurandya geniculata B.L.Rob. & Fernald

Species of flowering plant

Mabrya geniculata is a mat-forming herbaceous perennial native to the Mexican states of Sonora and Chihuahua. It has pale yellow tubular flowers. It was first described in 1894 by Benjamin L. Robinson and Merritt L. Fernald in the genus Maurandya and transferred to Mabrya by Wayne J. Elisens in 1985.

Elisens divided M. geniculata into three subspecies, M. g. geniculata, M. g. flaviflora and M. g. lanata. M. g. flaviflora was separated off as a full species, Mabrya flaviflora, by David A. Sutton in 1988. M. g. lanata differs from the nominate subspecies in having its stems and leaves densely covered in wool-like hairs. It occurs only in the state of Sonora.
