= Mabrya erecta =

Scientific classification
- Kingdom: Plantae
- Clade: Tracheophytes
- Clade: Angiosperms
- Clade: Eudicots
- Clade: Asterids
- Order: Lamiales
- Family: Plantaginaceae
- Genus: Mabrya
- Species: M. erecta

Binomial name
- Mabrya erecta (Hemsl.) Elisens

Synonyms
- Asarina hirsuta Pennell; Lophospermum erectum (Hemsl.) Rothm.; Maurandya erecta Hemsl.

Species of flowering plant

Mabrya erecta is a species of flowering plant in the family Plantaginaceae. It is an upright herbaceous perennial native to Mexico – the states of Chihuahua, Coahuila, Durango, Nuevo León and possibly México. Unlike other members of the genus Mabrya, it does not form mats. It has tubular flowers, whitish at the base and pink to red-violet at the apex. It was first described by William B. Hemsley in 1882 in the genus Maurandya and transferred to Mabrya by Wayne J. Elisens in 1985. The epithet erecta means erect or upright.
