= Mabrya rosei =

Scientific classification
- Kingdom: Plantae
- Clade: Tracheophytes
- Clade: Angiosperms
- Clade: Eudicots
- Clade: Asterids
- Order: Lamiales
- Family: Plantaginaceae
- Genus: Mabrya
- Species: M. rosei

Binomial name
- Mabrya rosei (Munz) Elisens

Synonyms
- Asarina rosei (Munz) Pennell; Maurandya rosei Munz

Species of flowering plant

Mabrya rosei is a mat-forming herbaceous perennial native to the Mexican states of Jalisco and Zacatecas. It has tubular flowers, whitish at the base and red to red-violet at the apex. It was first described by Philip A. Munz in 1926 in the genus Maurandya and transferred to Mabrya by Wayne J. Elisens in 1985. Munz did not explain the origin of the epithet rosei but listed the collector of the type specimen as Joseph Nelson Rose.
