= Mabrya flaviflora =

Scientific classification
- Kingdom: Plantae
- Clade: Tracheophytes
- Clade: Angiosperms
- Clade: Eudicots
- Clade: Asterids
- Order: Lamiales
- Family: Plantaginaceae
- Genus: Mabrya
- Species: M. flaviflora

Binomial name
- Mabrya flaviflora (I.M.Johnst.) D.A.Sutton

Synonyms
- Antirrhinum flaviflorum (I.M.Johnst.) Tidestr.; Asarina flaviflora (I.M.Johnst.) Pennell; Mabrya geniculata subsp. flaviflora (I.M.Johnst.) Elisens; Maurandya flaviflora I.M.Johnst.

Species of flowering plant

Mabrya flaviflora is a mat-forming herbaceous perennial native to a small area in Baja California Norte, Mexico. It has pale yellow tubular flowers. It was first described by Ivan M. Johnston in 1924 in the genus Maurandya and transferred to Mabrya by Wayne J. Elisens in 1985 as Mabrya geniculata subsp. flaviflora. It was restored to a full species within Mabrya by David A. Sutton in 1988. The epithet flaviflora means yellow-flowered.
