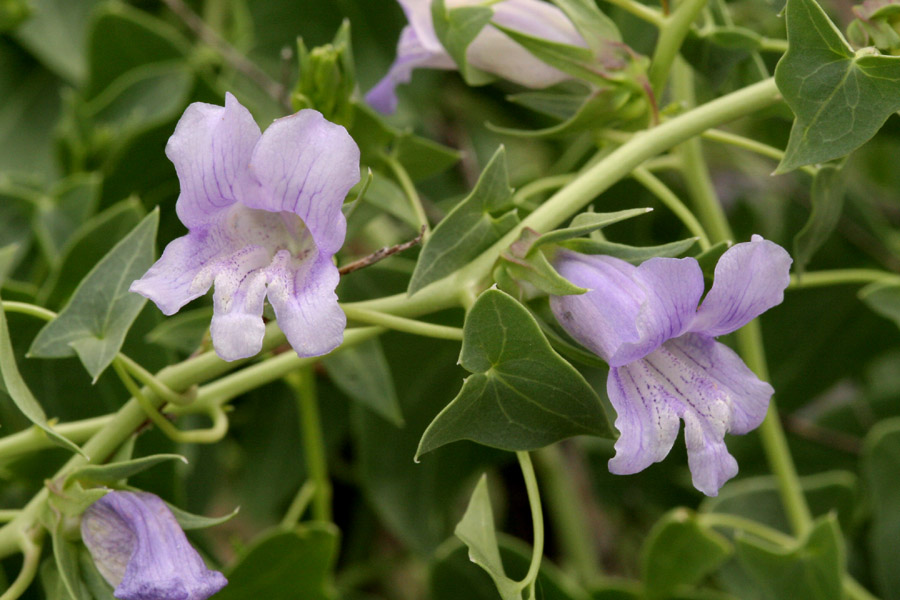

Scientific classification
- Kingdom: Plantae
- Clade: Tracheophytes
- Clade: Angiosperms
- Clade: Eudicots
- Clade: Asterids
- Order: Lamiales
- Family: Plantaginaceae
- Genus: Epixiphium; Munz (1926)
- Species: E. wislizeni

Binomial name
- Epixiphium wislizeni (Engelm. ex A.Gray) Munz (1926)

Synonyms
- Antirrhinum wislizeni (Engelm. ex A.Gray) Tidestr. (1941); Asarina wislizeni (Engelm. ex A.Gray) Pennell (1947); Maurandya wislizeni Engelm. ex A.Gray (1859)

= Epixiphium =

Species of flowering plant

Epixiphium wislizeni, commonly known as baloonbush, is a species of flowering plant in the plantain family, Plantaginaceae. It is the sole species in genus Epixiphium. It is a scrambling or climbing perennial subshrub native to Chihuahua state in northern Mexico and the south western United States (Arizona, California, New Mexico, and Texas) where it grows in sand dunes. It has tubular flowers in shades of blue to violet and white and more-or-less triangular untoothed leaves.

The species was first described in 1859 as Maurandya wislizeni. In 1926 Philip A. Munz placed it in a separate genus as Epixiphium wislizeni. The species epithet wislizeni commemorates Friedrich Adolph Wislizenus. It is regularly misspelt "wislizenii".

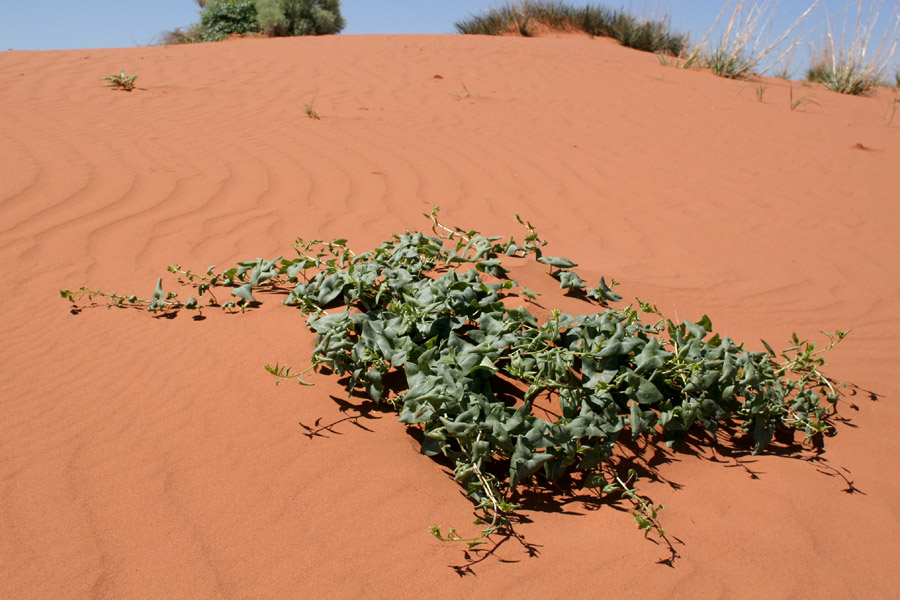
Growing in sand dunes
