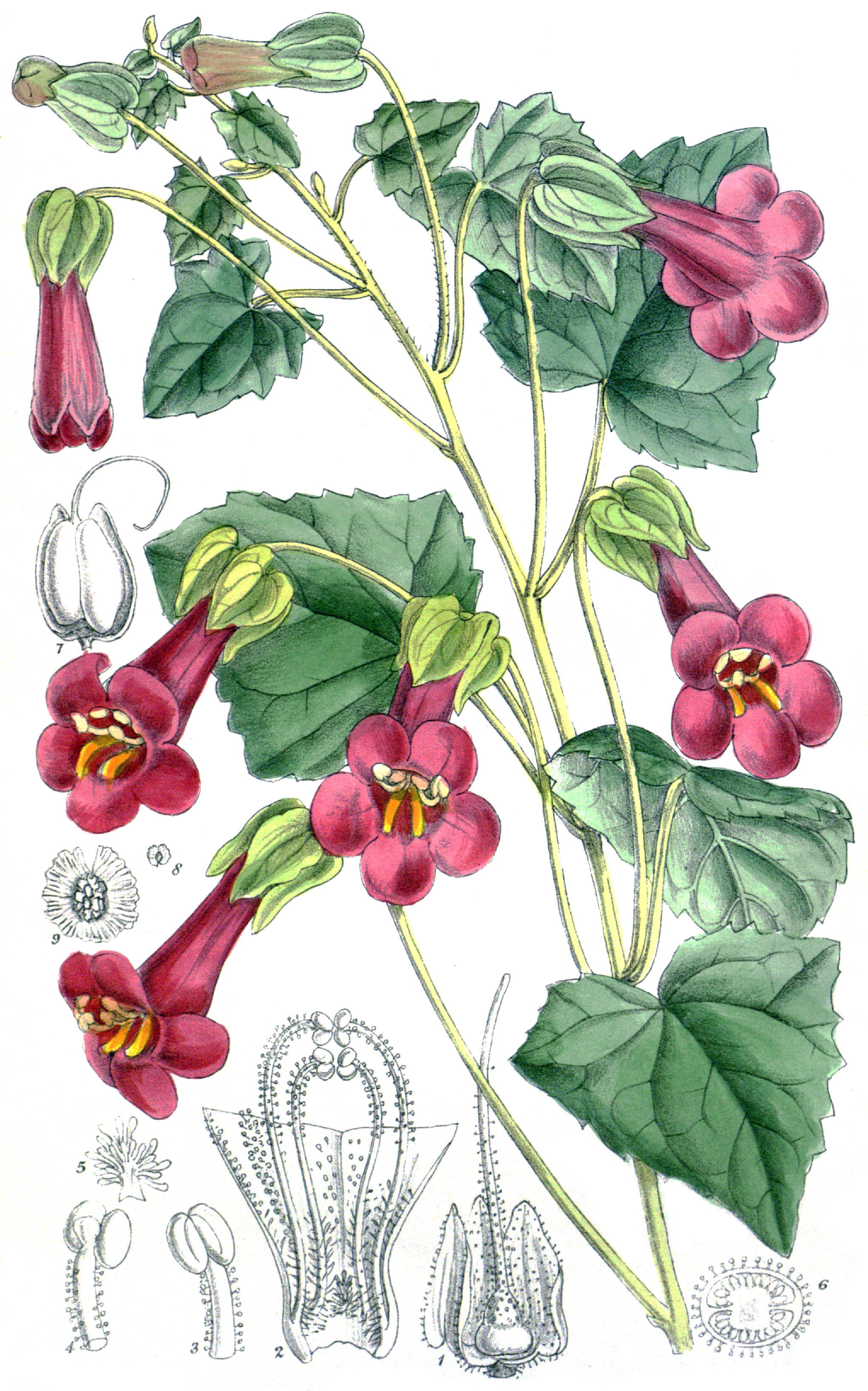
- Illustration from Curtis's Botanical Magazine, 1917

Scientific classification
- Kingdom: Plantae
- Clade: Tracheophytes
- Clade: Angiosperms
- Clade: Eudicots
- Clade: Asterids
- Order: Lamiales
- Family: Plantaginaceae
- Genus: Lophospermum
- Species: L. purpusii

Binomial name
- Lophospermum purpusii (Brandegee) Rothm.

Synonyms
- Asarina purpusii (Brandegee) Pennell; Maurandya erubescens var. purpusii (Brandegee) I.M. Johnst.; Maurandya purpusii Brandegee

= Lophospermum purpusii =

Species of flowering plant

Lophospermum purpusii is a scambling or climbing herbaceous perennial native to Mexico (the states of Oaxaca and Puebla). It has tubular flowers, white at the base and red to violet elsewhere.
