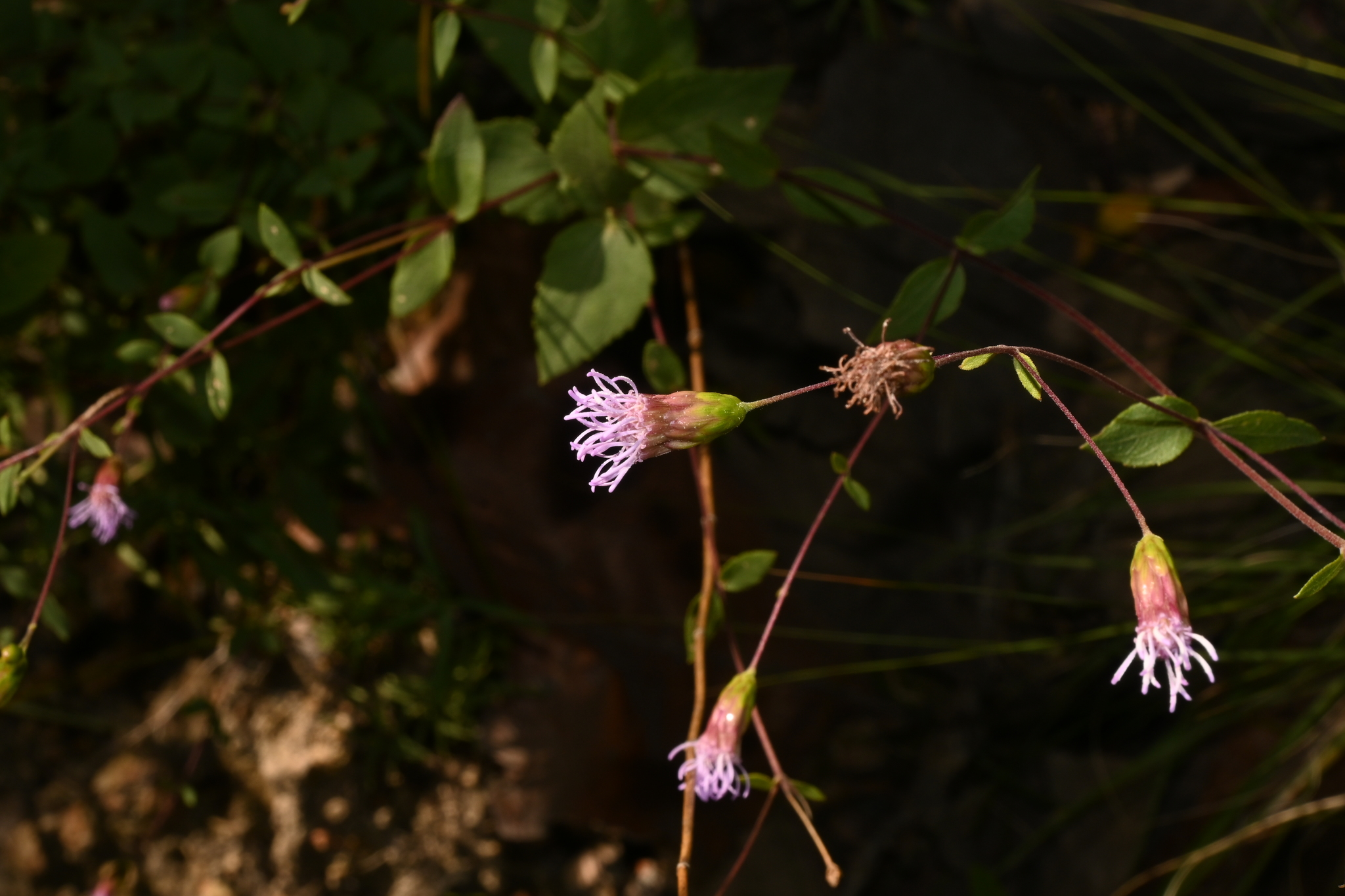
- Steviopsis dryophila

Scientific classification
- Kingdom: Plantae
- Clade: Embryophytes
- Clade: Tracheophytes
- Clade: Angiosperms
- Clade: Eudicots
- Clade: Asterids
- Order: Asterales
- Family: Asteraceae
- Subfamily: Asteroideae
- Tribe: Eupatorieae
- Genus: Steviopsis; R.M.King & H.Rob.

Type species
- Eupatorium adenospermum Sch.Bip.

= Steviopsis =

Genus of plants

Steviopsis is a genus of Mexican plants in the tribe Eupatorieae within the family Asteraceae.

== Description ==
Members of Steviopsis are perennial herbs that have heads composed entirely of disk flowers, a pappus of capillary bristles, narrow corollas with spreading lobes, and glands on the cypselae (achenes). The base chromosome number is x=10, which distinguishes it in part from the morphologically similar Brickellia. The genus is endemic to Mexico.

== Taxonomy ==
The genus was originally described by King and Robinson as part of the splitting of Eupatorium into monophyletic units. The distinctiveness and circumscription of the genus were recently assessed using molecular phylogenetic approaches

Species

- Steviopsis amblyolepis (B.L.Rob.) R.M.King & H.Rob. - Guerrero, Morelos, Michoacán
- Steviopsis arsenei R.M.King & H.Rob. - Michoacán
- Steviopsis dryophila (B.L.Rob.) B.L.Turner - Jalisco, Nayarit, Zacatecas, Sinaloa
- Steviopsis nesomii B.L.Turner - Nuevo León
- Steviopsis rapunculoides (DC.) R.M.King & H.Rob. - Jalisco, Guanajuato, Nayarit, Morelos, Michoacán
- Steviopsis vigintiseta (DC.) R.M.King & H.Rob. - Oaxaca, Puebla, Morelos, México State

formerly included

see Asanthus Brickelliastrum Dyscritogyne

- Steviopsis adenosperma - Dyscritogyne adenosperma
- Steviopsis dryophila - Dyscritogyne dryophila
- Steviopsis fendleri - Brickelliastrum fendleri
- Steviopsis squamulosa - Asanthus squamulosus
- Steviopsis thyrsiflora - Asanthus thyrsiflorus
- Steviopsis thyrsiflora var. solidaginifolia - Asanthus solidaginifolius
