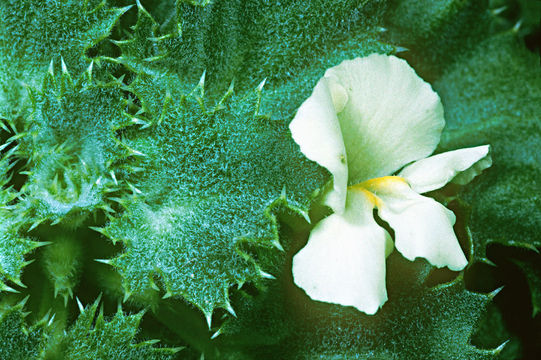

Conservation status
- Critically Imperiled (NatureServe)

Scientific classification
- Kingdom: Plantae
- Clade: Embryophytes
- Clade: Tracheophytes
- Clade: Angiosperms
- Clade: Eudicots
- Clade: Asterids
- Order: Lamiales
- Family: Plantaginaceae
- Tribe: Antirrhineae
- Genus: Holmgrenanthe; Elisens
- Species: H. petrophila

Binomial name
- Holmgrenanthe petrophila (Coville & C.V.Morton) Elisens

Synonyms
- Maurandya petrophila Coville & C.V.Morton; Asarina petrophila (Coville & C.V. Morton) Pennell; Maurandella petrophila (Coville & C.V. Morton) Rothm.

= Holmgrenanthe =

Genus of flowering plants

Holmgrenanthe petrophila (rocklady, formerly Maurandya petrophila) is a rare perennial desert plant in the plantain family (Plantaginaceae), and the sole species of the genus Holmgrenanthe. It forms low mats of branched stems growing from a woody base. The leaves have small spines along their edges. The solitary yellow flowers are tubular with five free lobes at the end, the upper two pointing backwards, the lower three projecting forwards. The species is known only from about ten locations, most in the Titus Canyon and the adjacent Fall Canyon, all within the Californian section of Death Valley National Park. It grows in limestone crevices on the canyon walls, often on the north face.

== Description ==
Holmgrenanthe petrophila is an herbaceous perennial with fibrous roots. It is low growing with slender, branched stems arising from a woody base; as it often grows on vertical faces, the stems tend to hang down. Close relatives climb using twining leaf stalks (petioles), but H. petrophila has straight petioles, 12–27 mm (0.5–1.1 in) long. The leaves are rounded or kidney shaped with small spines or bristles along the margins (spinulose) and at the apex. They are 12–35 mm (0.5–1.4 in) long by 14–27 mm (0.6–1.1 in) wide.

In its native habitat, H. petrophila flowers and fruits in spring and early summer, between April and June. The solitary flowers are borne on very short stalks (peduncles), only 1–4 mm (0.04–0.16 in) long. The green sepals are narrow, pointed and not joined, forming an urn shape around the base of the flower. They are 9–13 mm (0.4–0.5 in) long by 2–3 mm (0.08–0.12 in) wide at the base. They have small spines along their margins, like the leaves. The five petals forming the corolla are joined at their bases to form a tube 20–24 mm (0.8–0.9 in) long. The free lobes at the end of the flower are 7–12 mm (0.3–0.5 in) long and differentiated into two upper lobes, curving backwards, and three lower lobes, pointing forwards. The color of the corolla has been described as either sulfur yellow throughout or white with a yellow throat.

The style and stamens stay within the flower. The four stamens are of two lengths, the upper two with filaments 12–44 mm (0.5–1.7 in) long, the lower two with filaments 7–9 mm (0.3–0.4 in) long. There is also a fifth rudimentary sterile stamen. The ovary has a single chamber with an incomplete T-shaped septum. After fertilization, a globe shaped capsule forms containing tan colored seeds.

== Taxonomy ==
The genus Holmgrenanthe was established in 1985 by Wayne J. Elisens solely for the species H. petrophila, previously placed in Maurandya (including Maurandella). Elisens considered the species sufficiently different from other members of Maurandya to warrant a new genus. For example, it has short mat-forming stems, rather than long climbing or scrambling stems; the edges of the leaves and sepals are spiny; the ovary has a single chamber rather than two. The generic name honors Arthur H., Noel H., and Patricia K. Holmgren, described by Elisens as "dedicated botanists and students of the western flora."

The genus is placed in the tribe Antirrhineae, originally part of the family Scrophulariaceae, but now in the Plantaginaceae. Within this tribe, Elisens defined the subtribe Maurandyinae for the five North American genera Holmgrenanthe, Lophospermum, Mabrya, Maurandya and Rhodochiton (the last of which he included in Lophospermum).

=== Phylogeny ===
Lack of relevant information has led to Holmgrenanthe being excluded from the molecular phylogenetic studies confirming that Elisen's Maurandyinae together with Asarina and Cymbalaria form a monophyletic group (clade), but analyses based on morphological characters suggest that Holmgrenanthe was the first diverging genus within the clade, retaining features of the earliest ancestor. The cladogram presented by Ghebrehiwet is shown below:

- Tribe Antirrhineae
  - - Holmgrenanathe
    - - Asarina – not in Maurandyinae sensu Elisens
      - Mabrya
      - - Maurandya (including Maurandella)
        - - Lophospermum (including Epixiphium)
          - Rhodochiton
  - rest of the tribe

=== Species ===
The sole species in the genus, Holmgrenanthe petrophila, was first described in 1935 by Frederick Vernon Coville and Conrad Vernon Morton (as Maurandya petrophila). They did not explain the origin of the specific epithet, but petro- is derived from the Greek for rock and -phila from the Greek for beloved, so that petrophila means "rock-loving". The plants described by Coville and Morton were growing in a north facing vertical limestone wall in Titus Canyon in Death Valley, California. As noted above, the species was transferred to the new genus by Elisens in 1985.

== Distribution and habitat ==
After the species was first discovered in Titus Canyon, further plants were found in the adjacent Fall Canyon. It is known only from about ten locations, mostly in these two canyons, all within the Californian section of Death Valley National Park. It grows in limestone crevices on the canyon walls, often on the north face, in areas dominated by creosote bush scrub. Elisens suggested that Holmgrenanthe petrophila might be a "paleoendemic", originally having a much larger range, but now confined to more sheltered and moister microhabitats in desert canyons as a consequence of a warming and drying trend 11,000–8,000 years ago.

== Conservation ==
As of July 2014, Holmgrenanthe petrophila is listed by the California Native Plant Society as "rare, threatened, or endangered in California and elsewhere". It is listed as critically endangered by the California State but is not listed at the federal level in the United States, nor in the IUCN Red List.
