= Brickellia pavonii =

Scientific classification
- Kingdom: Plantae
- Clade: Tracheophytes
- Clade: Angiosperms
- Clade: Eudicots
- Clade: Asterids
- Order: Asterales
- Family: Asteraceae
- Genus: Brickellia
- Species: B. pavonii

Binomial name
- Brickellia pavonii (A.Gray) B.L.Turner 1991

Synonyms
- Barroetea pavonii A.Gray 1882; Eupatorium cuspidatum Sessé & Moc 1890, not Spreng. ex DC. 1836; Eupatorium cuspidatum Pav. ex A.Gray 1882, not Spreng. ex DC. 1836; Eupatorium setiferum Pav. ex A.Gray

Species of flowering plant

Brickellia pavonii is a Mexican species of flowering plants in the family Asteraceae. It is native to central Mexico in the states of Oaxaca and Veracruz.

The species is named for Spanish botanist Hipólito Ruiz López, 1754 – 1816.
