= Rhodochiton hintonii =

Scientific classification
- Kingdom: Plantae
- Clade: Tracheophytes
- Clade: Angiosperms
- Clade: Eudicots
- Clade: Asterids
- Order: Lamiales
- Family: Plantaginaceae
- Genus: Rhodochiton
- Species: R. hintonii

Binomial name
- Rhodochiton hintonii (Elisens) D.A.Sutton

Synonyms
- Lophospermum hintonii Elisens

Species of flowering plant

Rhodochiton hintonii is a climbing or sprawling herbaceous perennial native to the state of Guerrero in Mexico. It has dangling flowers, with a bell-shaped calyx and dark purple petals forming a tube. Unlike the better known Rhodochiton atrosanguineus, the petal tube is asymmetrical with two "lips".

The species was first described by Wayne J. Elisens in 1985. The specific epithet hintonii commemorates G.B. Hinton, described as a "pioneer plant collector in Mexico". It was transferred from the genus Lophospermum to Rhodochiton by David A. Sutton in 1988.
