= Rhodochiton nubicola =

Scientific classification
- Kingdom: Plantae
- Clade: Tracheophytes
- Clade: Angiosperms
- Clade: Eudicots
- Clade: Asterids
- Order: Lamiales
- Family: Plantaginaceae
- Genus: Rhodochiton
- Species: R. nubicola

Binomial name
- Rhodochiton nubicola (Elisens) D.A.Sutton

Synonyms
- Lophospermum nubicola Elisens

Species of flowering plant

Rhodochiton nubicola is a climbing or sprawling herbaceous perennial native to the state of Chiapas in Mexico and to Guatemala, where it grows in cloud forests at between 1,300 and 3,000 m (4,300 and 9,800 ft). It has dangling flowers, with a bell-shaped calyx and dark purple petals forming a tube. Unlike the better known Rhodochiton atrosanguineus, the petal tube is asymmetrical with two "lips".

The species was first described by Wayne J. Elisens in 1985. The specific epithet nubicola is a noun derived from Latin nubes, cloud, and -cola, dweller, thus meaning "cloud dweller". It was transferred from the genus Lophospermum to Rhodochiton by David A. Sutton in 1988.
