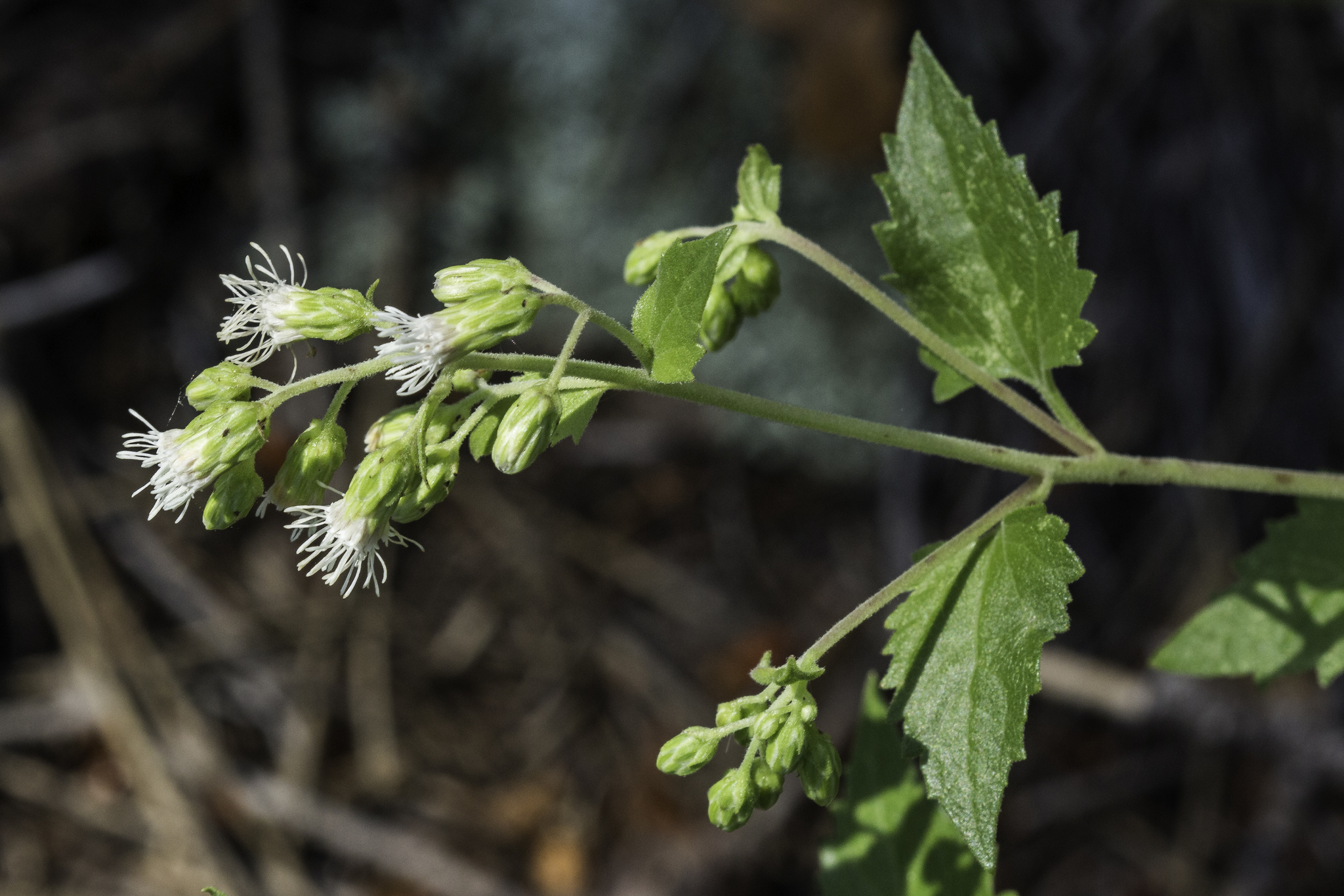

Conservation status
- Apparently Secure (NatureServe)

Scientific classification
- Kingdom: Plantae
- Clade: Tracheophytes
- Clade: Angiosperms
- Clade: Eudicots
- Clade: Asterids
- Order: Asterales
- Family: Asteraceae
- Genus: Brickelliastrum
- Species: B. fendleri

Binomial name
- Brickelliastrum fendleri (A.Gray) R.M.King & H.Rob.

Synonyms
- Synonymy: Brickellia ambigens (Greene) A.Nelson; Brickellia fendleri A.Gray; Brickellia fendleri var. fendleri; Brickellia fendleri var. nepetifolia B.L.Rob.; Coleosanthus ambigens Greene; Coleosanthus fendleri Greene; Coleosanthus modestus Greene; Coleosanthus nepetaefolius Greene; Eupatorium fendleri (A.Gray) A.Gray; Steviopsis fendleri (A.Gray) B.L.Turner

= Brickelliastrum fendleri =

Species of flowering plant

Brickelliastrum fendleri, known by the common name Fendler's brickellbush, is a species of flowering plant in the family Asteraceae. It is native to New Mexico, Arizona, Texas, and Mexico.

== Description ==
Brickelliastrum fendleri is a perennial herb or subshrub. It can reach around 80 centimeters tall. It produces cymose panicles, each with a few heads of flowers. Its bright white flowers help distinguish it from the similar species Brickellia grandiflora, which has more cream or yellow-colored flowers. Brickellia grandiflora also has a row of bracts around the outer calyx, which Brickelliastrum fendleri lacks.

Brickelliastrum fendleri has simple leaves that are usually oppositely arranged. Its deltoid or triangular-ovate leaves have crenate-serrate to serrate margins, and truncate to cordate bases. It is fibrous-rooted and has woody caudices.

The fruit is a cypsela, although it is often incorrectly referred to as an achene. Fruits are 5-ribbed.

== Ecology ==
Brickelliastrum fendleri has been documented in New Mexico, eastern Arizona, west Texas, and northern Mexico. It grows in pine and mixed conifer woodlands and on limestone boulders, ridgetops, sandstone bluffs, and crevices. It grows at elevations of around 6,000–9,500 feet (1829–2896 meters).

It flowers from July to October.

== Etymology ==
Brickelliastrum is derived from the genus Brickellia, which is named for 1748–1809, Irish-born physician and naturalist. The specific epithet fendleri is for Augustus Fendler.
