= Lophospermum turneri =

Scientific classification
- Kingdom: Plantae
- Clade: Embryophytes
- Clade: Tracheophytes
- Clade: Angiosperms
- Clade: Eudicots
- Clade: Asterids
- Order: Lamiales
- Family: Plantaginaceae
- Genus: Lophospermum
- Species: L. turneri

Binomial name
- Lophospermum turneri Elisens

Species of flowering plant

Lophospermum turneri is a climbing or scrambling herbaceous perennial native to Guatemala and the state of Chiapas in Mexico, where it was first collected. It has tubular flowers, lavender to violet in colour. It was first described by Wayne J. Elisens in 1985. The epithet turneri commemorates Billie L. Turner, described as "mentor of many students of the Latin American flora".
