= Lophospermum breedlovei =

Scientific classification
- Kingdom: Plantae
- Clade: Tracheophytes
- Clade: Angiosperms
- Clade: Eudicots
- Clade: Asterids
- Order: Lamiales
- Family: Plantaginaceae
- Genus: Lophospermum
- Species: L. breedlovei

Binomial name
- Lophospermum breedlovei Elisens

Species of flowering plant

Lophospermum breedlovei is a climbing or scrambling herbaceous perennial native only to the state of Chiapas in Mexico. It has tubular flowers, white at the base and dark purple elsewhere. It was first described by Wayne J. Elisens in 1985. The epithet breedlovei commemorates Dennis E. Breedlove, described as a "prolific plant collector and authority on the flora of Chiapas".
