= Lophospermum purpurascens =

Scientific classification
- Kingdom: Plantae
- Clade: Embryophytes
- Clade: Tracheophytes
- Clade: Angiosperms
- Clade: Eudicots
- Clade: Asterids
- Order: Lamiales
- Family: Plantaginaceae
- Genus: Lophospermum
- Species: L. purpurascens

Binomial name
- Lophospermum purpurascens Elisens

Species of flowering plant

Lophospermum purpurascens is a climbing or scrambling herbaceous perennial native to Mexico, occurring in the states of Oaxaca, Veracruz and possibly Puebla. It has tubular flowers, white at the base and dark purple elsewhere. It was first described by Wayne J. Elisens in 1985. The epithet purpurascens means purplish or becoming purple.
