= Brickelliastrum nesomii =

Scientific classification
- Kingdom: Plantae
- Clade: Tracheophytes
- Clade: Angiosperms
- Clade: Eudicots
- Clade: Asterids
- Order: Asterales
- Family: Asteraceae
- Genus: Brickelliastrum
- Species: B. nesomii

Binomial name
- Brickelliastrum nesomii (B.L.Turner) R.M.King & H.Rob.

Synonyms
- Brickellia villarrealii (R.M.King & H.Rob.) Govaerts; Brickelliastrum villarrealii R.M.King & H.Rob.; Steviopsis nesomii B.L.Turner in Phytologia 68: 410 (1990)

Species of plant

Brickelliastrum nesomii, synonym Steviopsis nesomii, is a species of Mexican plants in the family Asteraceae. It has been found only in the states of Nuevo León and Tamaulipas in northeastern Mexico.
