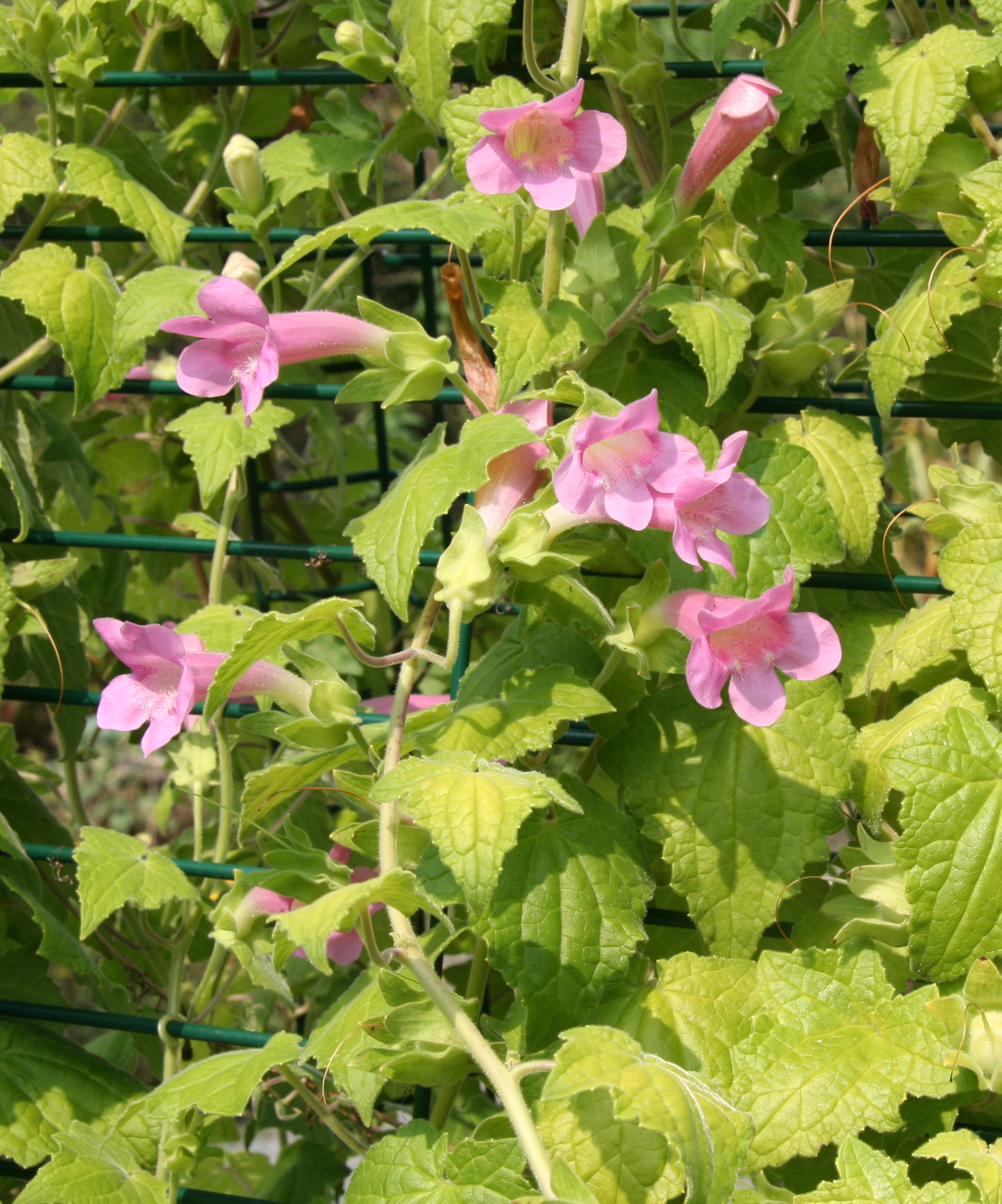
- Lophospermum erubescens

Scientific classification
- Kingdom: Plantae
- Clade: Tracheophytes
- Clade: Angiosperms
- Clade: Eudicots
- Clade: Asterids
- Order: Lamiales
- Family: Plantaginaceae
- Tribe: Antirrhineae
- Genus: Lophospermum; D.Don ex R.Taylor

Species
- See text

Synonyms
- Maurandya section Lophospermum (D.Don) A.Gray; Lophospermum section Lophospermum sensu Elisens

= Lophospermum =

Genus of flowering plants

Lophospermum is a genus of herbaceous perennial climbers or scramblers, native to mountainous regions of Mexico and Guatemala. Those that climb use twining leaf stalks. Their flowers are tubular, in shades of red, violet and purple, the larger flowers being pollinated by hummingbirds. Now placed in the greatly expanded family Plantaginaceae, the genus was traditionally placed in the Scrophulariaceae. The close relationship with some other genera, particularly Maurandya and Rhodochiton, has led to confusion over the names of some species.

Lophospermum erubescens and Lophospermum scandens are cultivated as ornamental plants, as climbers or trailers. Various Lophospermum cultivars are grown, often under trade names such as "Lofos®".

== Description ==
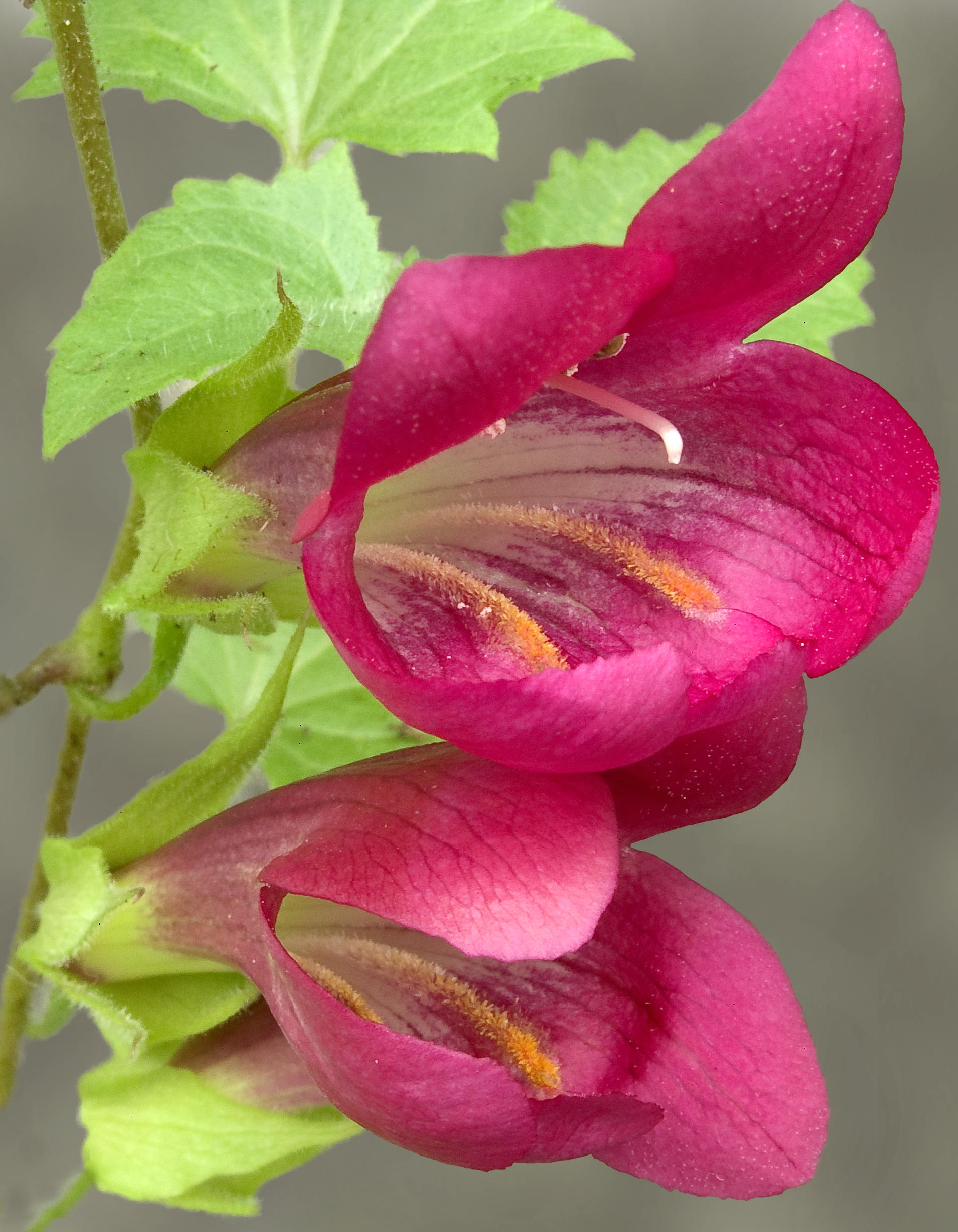
Close up of flowers of a Lophospermum grown from commercial seed; probably Lophospermum scandens

Lophospermum species are herbaceous perennial climbers with fibrous roots. They climb by means of twining leaf stalks (petioles) rather than tendrils or twining stems. The long stems are branched, becoming woody at the base with age. In some species the stems grow from a woody caudex – a swollen, bulb-like structure at the base of the stem. The leaves are triangular or heart-shaped with a pointed apex and toothed edges (crenate or dentate). Both stems and leaves may have a purplish colour.

Species generally flower and fruit over a long season; for example, from April to the following January in the case of Lophospermum erubescens. The flowers are borne singly on stems (peduncles) which are either held horizontally or grow upwards. The calyx has sepals that are either free or somewhat joined at the base, and overlap or curve outwards. They may be green or tinted with red or purple. The flowers have five petals in shades of red, violet or dark purple, joined at the base to form a tube. The free lobes of the upper two petals are differentiated from those of the lower three petals: for example, the upper two may curve back and the lower three point forwards. There are two prominent folds (plicae) running along the length of the base of the flower tube, usually yellowish in colour with hairs whose length helps to distinguish the species. There are four fertile stamens, of two different lengths, and one infertile stamen. The stamens and style are held inside the flower.

The ovary has two chambers (locules). After fertilization, an ovoid or globe-shaped capsule forms filled with brown seeds, each with a circular "wing" around it.

== Taxonomy ==
The genus Lophospermum was first described in March 1826 by David Don in a paper read to the Linnean Society of London. His account was summarized in the same month in the Philosophical Magazine and Journal and subsequently published in 1827 in the Transactions of the Linnean Society. Don described Lophospermum as closely related to Antirrhinum and Maurandya but distinguished by its bell-shaped (campanulate) flowers and winged seeds. Lophospermum means "with crested seeds". Initially two species were described, Lophospermum scandens and Lophospermum physalodes. (The latter is now Melasma physalodes.)

The genus is placed in the tribe Antirrhineae; within this tribe, it is closely related to Maurandya (including Maurandella), Mabrya and Rhodochiton. It has been included in Maurandya as section Lophospermum. Rhodochiton has been included in Lophospermum as section Rhodochiton. Scientific names within these three genera have been confused; for example, an image accepted by Tropicos as Lophospermum erubescens bears the caption Maurandya barclaiana (a variant spelling of Maurandya barclayana).

=== Phylogeny ===
A number of molecular phylogenetic studies have shown that subtribe Maurandyinae, defined by Elisen to consist of the five North American genera Holmgrenanthe, Lophospermum, Mabrya, Maurandya and Rhodochiton, forms a monophyletic group, which is related to the Old World genera Cymbalaria and Asarina. Gehebrehiwet et al. suggested that the Maurandyinae could be expanded to include Cymbalaria and Asarina. Vargas et al. presented the following cladogram in 2013:

- Antirrhineae
  - other clades
  - - Cymbalaria lineage
      - - Asarina
        - Cymbalaria
      - Maurandyinae sensu Elisens
        - Maurandya (including M. antirrhiniflora)
        - - Rhodochiton
          - - Lophospermum
            - Mabrya

Vargas et al. concluded that the Antirrhineae evolved in the Old World and subsequently colonized North America more than once, probably in the Miocene epoch (23 to 5 million years ago). One such colonization led to the evolution of the Maurandyinae (in Elisen's sense).

=== Species ===
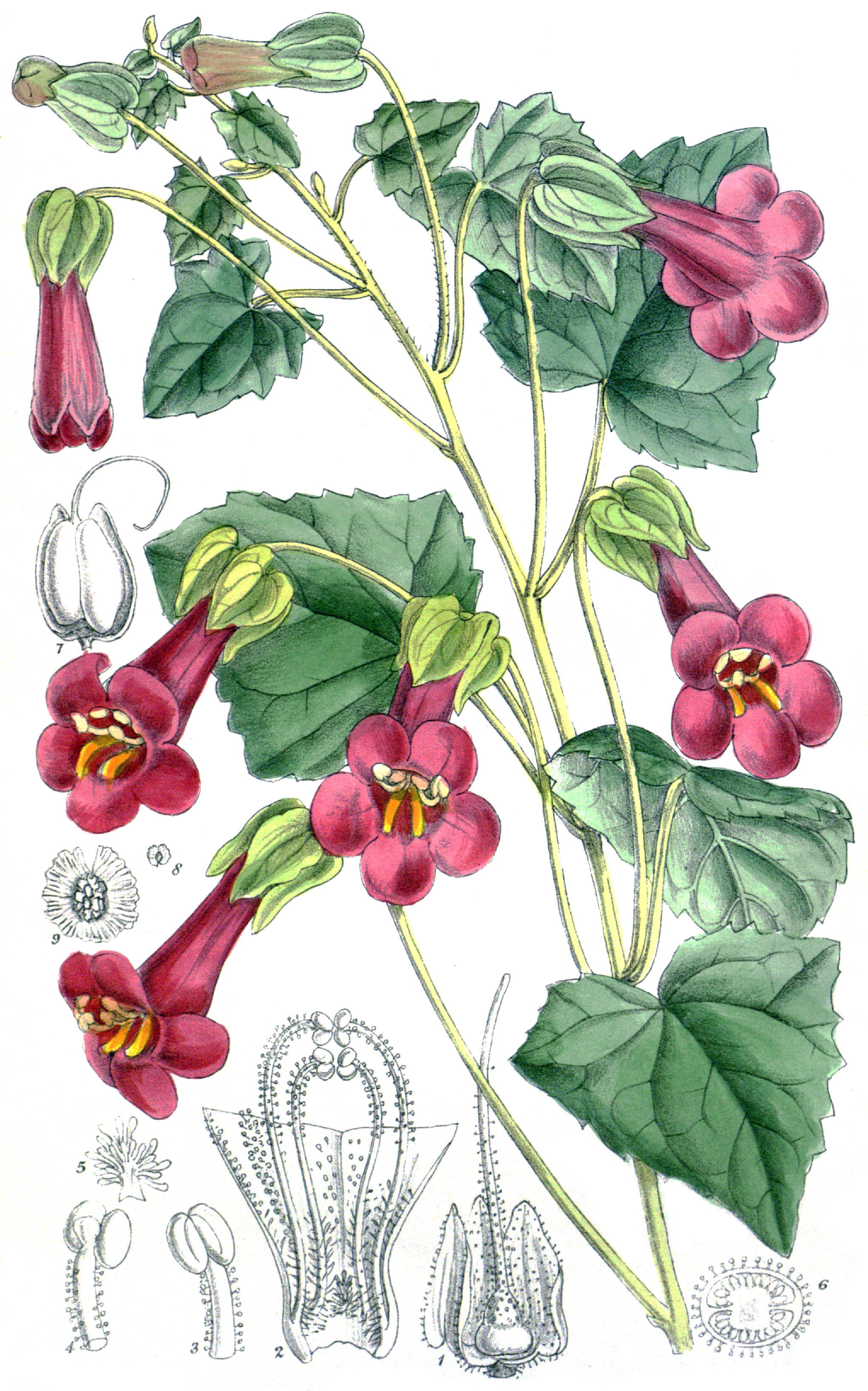
Lophospermum purpusii

As of July 2014, The Plant List accepts seven species (based on Tropicos and the World Checklist of Selected Plant Families): (Note: In addition to these seven species, The Plant List (version 1.1) also gives Lophospermum nubiculum Elisens as an accepted name, citing Tropicos. However, as of 16 July 2014, the record for this name is marked "inactive" in Tropicos if reached via The Plant List, and the name cannot be found in a search. The name Lophospermum nubiculum does not appear in Elisens (1985), and appears to be an orthographic error for Lophospermum nubicola (a synonym of Rhodochiton nubicola).)

- Lophospermum breedlovei Elisens
- Lophospermum chiapense Elisens
- Lophospermum erubescens D.Don
- Lophospermum purpurascens Elisens
- Lophospermum purpusii (Brandegee) Rothm.
- Lophospermum scandens D.Don
- Lophospermum turneri Elisens

In his 1985 monograph, Wayne J. Elisens included Rhodochiton in Lophospermum as section Rhodochiton:

- Lophospermum atrosanguineum = Rhodochiton atrosanguineum (Zucc.) Rothm.
- Lophospermum hintonii = Rhodochiton hintonii (Elisens) D.A.Sutton
- Lophospermum nubicola = Rhodochiton nubicola (Elisens) D.A.Sutton

== Distribution and habitat ==
Distribution of Lophospermum species: the distribution is discontinuous within the two areas shown.

Species of Lophospermum are native to mountainous regions of Mexico and parts of adjoining Guatemala: the Sierra Madre Oriental, the Sierra Madre del Sur and the Sierra Madre de Chiapas, as well as the Altiplano and the Cordillera Neovolcánica. Most species have small discrete ranges; the exception is L. erubescens which has a wider distribution in oak forests of the Sierra Madre Oriental. They are usually found between 500 and 3,000 m (1,600 and 9,800 ft) in oak or oak-pine forests or deciduous tropical forests (L. purpusii). L. scandens will grow on recent lava flows.

Lophospermum erubescens has become naturalized in many tropical and subtropical areas of the world, including Colombia, Venezuela, Jamaica and Hawaii, as well as Australia (New South Wales and Queensland).

== Ecology ==
Lophospermum erubescens and L. scandens are known to be pollinated by hummingbirds. Species pollinated in this way typically have yellow to red, open throated flowers with long floral tubes, up to 63 mm (2.5 in) long in L. erubescens. The pollinators of the remaining species are unknown, but Elisens suggests that, based on floral colour and morphology, L. purpusii is similarly hummingbird-pollinated, whereas L. breedlovei, L. chiapense, L. purpurascens and L. turneri may be pollinated by bees, as they have differently shaped flowers, with landing platforms and narrower openings to the flower tubes. The nectar composition of L. purpusii is similar to other hummingbird-pollinated flowers, whereas that of L. turneri is quite different, with a very high proportion of sucrose.

== Cultivation ==
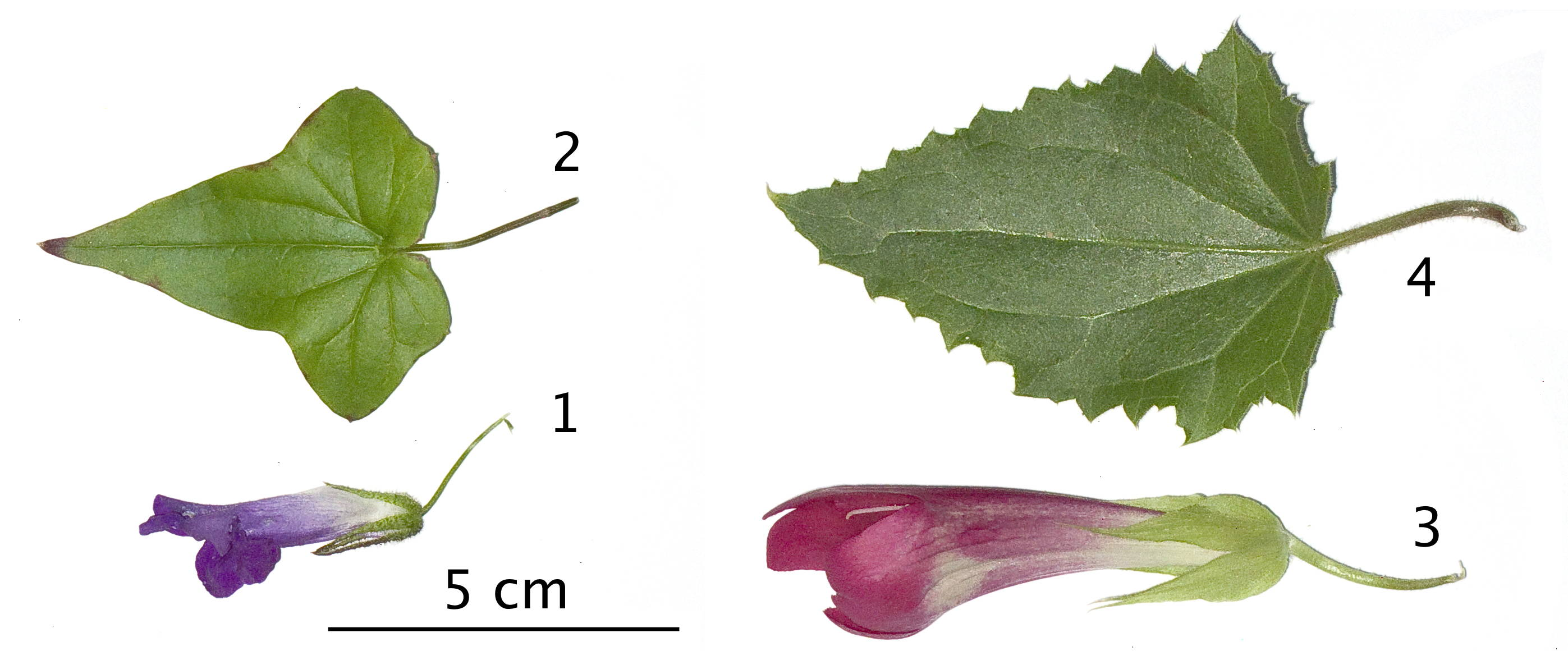
Comparison of Lophospermum scandens with Maurandya barclayana: 1 Maurandya flower is shorter with narrower sepals 2 Maurandya leaf is smooth with entire (untoothed) margins 3 Lophospermum flower is longer with broader sepals 4 Lophospermum leaf is somewhat hairy with toothed margins

Lophospermum erubescens has been cultivated as an ornamental climber since at least the 19th century. Joseph Paxton described its cultivation in 1836, saying that it was "a very fine creeper and deserves growing by every lover of plants". Other species that have been cultivated include L. purpusii and L. scandens. Some cultivars of Lophospermum are available; Suntory Flowers (a division of the Japanese firm Suntory) has introduced a number under the registered name "Lofos®", with selling names such as Compact White, Compact Pink, Wine Red (='Sunasaro') and Summer Cream (='Sunasashiro'). Those which are the subject of US Plant Patents are described as originating from the hybrid Lophospermum scandens × L. erubescens, a hybrid known since the 1840s.

As noted above, Lophospermum species have in the past been placed in Maurandya and the two genera have regularly been confused, particularly in cultivation. For example, the cultivar Lophospermum 'Magic Dragon' (a cross between Lophospermum 'Red Dragon' and L. erubescens) was patented under the genus name Maurandya. Cultivated species of Lophospermum have longer flowers than those of Maurandya and leaves with toothed rather than entire margins. The Suntory cultivars were patented under the generic name Asarina, now treated as an entirely European genus.

Plants may be grown from seed and treated as annuals. In frost-free climates, or where the roots can be protected from frost, plants may be perennial, regrowing from the base after dying back in the winter. Selected forms and cultivars may be grown from cuttings.
