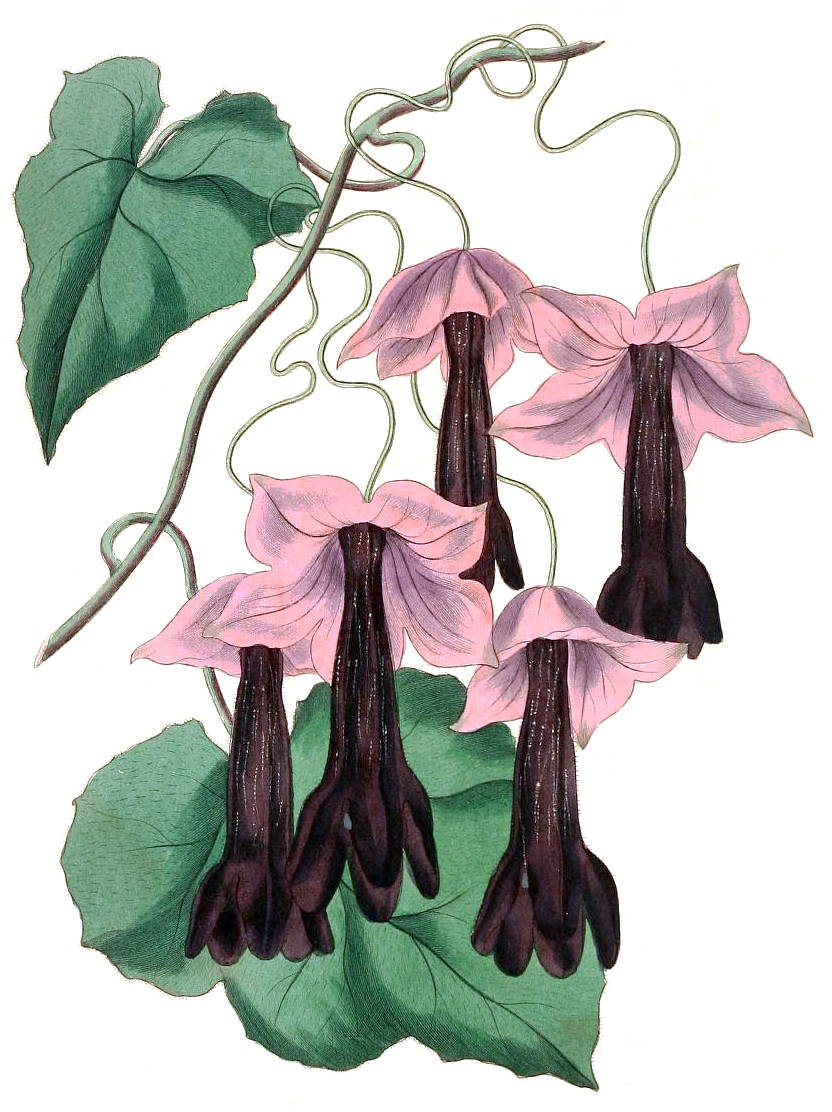
- Rhodochiton atrosanguineus from Paxton's Magazine of Botany, vol. 2 (1836)

Scientific classification
- Kingdom: Plantae
- Clade: Tracheophytes
- Clade: Angiosperms
- Clade: Eudicots
- Clade: Asterids
- Order: Lamiales
- Family: Plantaginaceae
- Tribe: Antirrhineae
- Genus: Rhodochiton; Zucc. ex Otto & A.Dietr.

Species
- See text

= Rhodochiton =

Genus of flowering plants

Rhodochiton is a genus of flowering plants within the family Plantaginaceae, native to southern Mexico and neighbouring Guatemala. They climb by means of twining leaf stalks. One of the three species, Rhodochiton atrosanguineus, the purple bell vine, is grown as an ornamental plant. All three species are sometimes included in Lophospermum.

== Description ==
Rhodochiton species are herbaceous perennials. They have long climbing or sprawling stems, branching and becoming woody at the base with age. They cling by means of twining leaf stalks (petioles). Their leaves are more or less heart-shaped, with pointed ends.

The solitary flowers are carried on relatively long stalks (peduncles) that are pendant, causing the flowers to hang downwards. The sepals, usually tinted rose or purple, are joined at the base and together form an expanded bell shape around the flower. The five petals are joined at the base to form a tube, light purple at the base and dark purple towards the tips. The free ends of the petals are either all bent backwards (R. atrosanguineus) or differentiated into two groups (the other two species): the upper two being bent backwards and the lower two facing forwards. There are four stamens, either all more or less the same length or in two pairs of different lengths. The fifth stamen is sterile and rudimentary. After fertilization a globe shaped capsule forms.

== Taxonomy ==
Wayne J. Elisens has outlined the somewhat confused taxonomic history of the genus name Rhodochiton. In 1829, Joseph Gerhard Zuccarini sent seeds and a description to individuals and botanical gardens under the name "Rhodochiton volubile"; however this name was not published so no new genus name was established. In 1832, Zuccarini published the name Lophospermum atrosanguineum for the same species, writing that "I held it at first to be new genus and sent the seeds obtained in the summer of 1829 to several gardens under the name Rhodochiton volubile. The figure in the Botanical Register [of Lophospermum erubescens D.Don] has convinced me of the identity of the genus" (i.e. that it was Lophospermum rather than a new genus). Not knowing of Zuccharini's change of name, in 1834 Christoph Friedrich Otto and Albert Gottfried Dietrich published and illustrated Rhodochiton volubilis. This is taken as the date for the publication of the generic name. (Note: The name published originally was Rhodochiton volubile. However, chiton in Greek is masculine, so the epithet should be volubilis. The International Code of Nomenclature for algae, fungi, and plants requires incorrect genders to be corrected.)

The genus is placed in the tribe Antirrhineae; within this tribe, it is closely related to Lophospermum, Maurandya (including Maurandella) and Mabrya. It has been included in Lophospermum as section Rhodochiton.

=== Phylogeny ===
A number of molecular phylogenetic studies have shown that subtribe Maurandyinae, defined by Elisens to consist of the five North American genera Holmgrenanthe, Lophospermum, Mabrya, Maurandya and Rhodochiton, forms a monophyletic group, which is related to the Old World genera Cymbalaria and Asarina. Gehebrehiwet et al. suggested that the Maurandyinae could be expanded to include Cymbalaria and Asarina. Vargas et al. presented the following cladogram in 2013, in which Rhodochiton is sister to the combination of Lophospermum and Mabrya, so that including it in Lophospermum would make the latter paraphyletic.

- Antirrhineae
  - other clades
  - - Cymbalaria lineage
      - - Asarina
        - Cymbalaria
      - Maurandyinae sensu Elisens
        - Maurandya (including M. antirrhiniflora)
        - - Rhodochiton
          - - Lophospermum
            - Mabrya

Vargas et al. concluded that the Antirrhineae evolved in the Old World and subsequently colonized North America more than once, probably in the Miocene epoch (23 to 5 million years ago). One such colonization led to the evolution of the Maurandyinae (in Elisen's sense).

=== Species ===
There are three species:

- Rhodochiton atrosanguineus (Zucc.) Rothm. (syn. R. volubilis)
- Rhodochiton hintonii (Elisens) D.A.Sutton
- Rhodochiton nubicola (Elisens) D.A.Sutton

As noted above, Elisens places all three in Lophospermum section Rhodochiton.

== Distribution and habitat ==
Distribution of Rhodochiton species

The three species of Rhodochiton have very local distributions: in the Sierra Madre del Sur mountains, Mexico; northern Oaxaca, Mexico; and Chiapas, Mexico and neighbouring Guatemala. All grow in montane cloud forests, at altitudes of between 1,300 and 3,500 metres (4,300 and 11,500 ft). Elisens described their habitats as "relatively inaccessible".

== Cultivation ==
Rhodochiton atrosanguineus was in cultivation before 1828, when seeds were given to Zuccarini by Baron Karwinski. In 1836, Joseph Paxton included it in a "select list of ornamental creepers". In frost-free areas it is perennial; in areas prone to winter frosts it can either be grown under glass as a perennial or outside as an annual, propagated from seed. In such conditions, it reaches a height of about 1.5–2.5 m (5–8 ft).
