= Lophospermum chiapense =

Scientific classification
- Kingdom: Plantae
- Clade: Tracheophytes
- Clade: Angiosperms
- Clade: Eudicots
- Clade: Asterids
- Order: Lamiales
- Family: Plantaginaceae
- Genus: Lophospermum
- Species: L. chiapense

Binomial name
- Lophospermum chiapense Elisens

Species of flowering plant

Lophospermum chiapense is a climbing or scrambling herbaceous perennial known only from one location in the state of Chiapas in Mexico, where it was first collected. It has tubular flowers, white at the base and violet elsewhere. It was first described by Wayne J. Elisens in 1985. The epithet chiapense refers to its place of collection.
