= Brickelliastrum =

Scientific classification
- Kingdom: Plantae
- Clade: Tracheophytes
- Clade: Angiosperms
- Clade: Eudicots
- Clade: Asterids
- Order: Asterales
- Family: Asteraceae
- Subfamily: Asteroideae
- Tribe: Eupatorieae
- Genus: Brickelliastrum; R.M.King & H.Rob.

Genus of plants

Brickelliastrum is a North American genus of flowering plants in the tribe Eupatorieae within the family Asteraceae. Its species are native to Arizona, New Mexico, and Texas in the United States and to northern Mexico.

Brickelliastrum has at times been lumped with Brickellia or Steviopsis, but chromosome number (x=10) and molecular data are in agreement in showing that it is distinct from either of these. Despite having the general appearance of Brickellia, members of Brickelliastrum have cypselae that have only 5-7 ribs (vs. 10), funnel-shaped corollas, and a style with an unenlarged, glabrous base.

== Species ==
As of May 2024, Plants of the World Online accepted two species:

- Brickelliastrum fendleri (A.Gray) R.M.King & H.Rob.
- Brickelliastrum nesomii (B.L.Turner) R.M.King & H.Rob., syns. Brickelliastrum villarrealii, Steviopsis nesomii B.L.Turner
