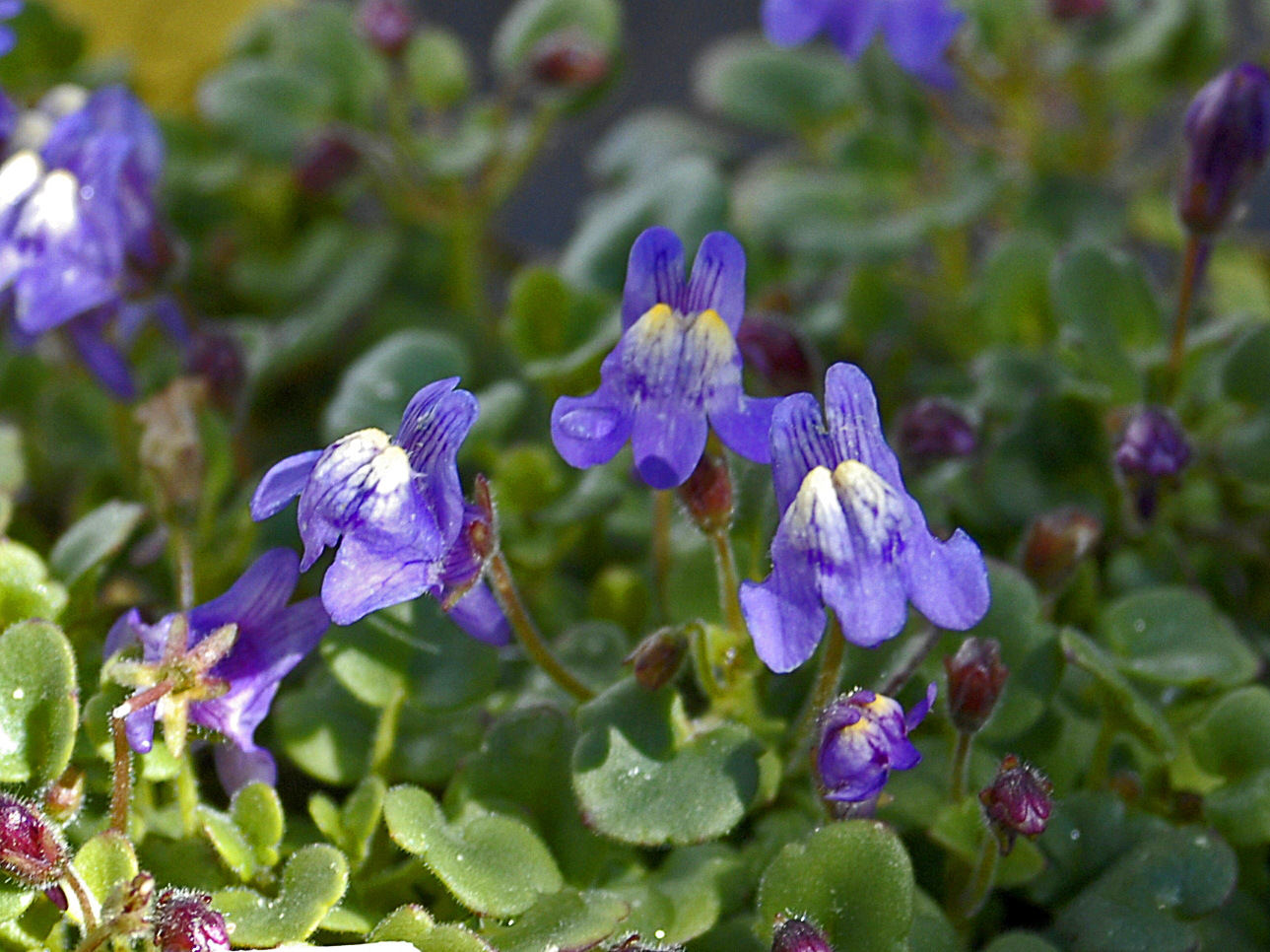
- Flowers of Cymbalaria pallida

Scientific classification
- Kingdom: Plantae
- Clade: Embryophytes
- Clade: Tracheophytes
- Clade: Angiosperms
- Clade: Eudicots
- Clade: Asterids
- Order: Lamiales
- Family: Plantaginaceae
- Genus: Cymbalaria
- Species: C. pallida

Binomial name
- Cymbalaria pallida (Ten.) Wettst.

Synonyms
- Antirrhinum pallidum Ten.; Antirrhinum pubescens Ten.; Cymbalaria pallida var. beguinotii (Cuf.) Cuf.; Linaria apennina Tausch; Linaria pallida (Ten.) Guss.; Linaria pallida (Ten.) Ten.; Linaria pallida var. beguinotii Cuf.; Linaria pilosa var. longicalcarata Regel; Linaria pubescens Sprengel

= Cymbalaria pallida =

Species of flowering plant

Cymbalaria pallida is a purple-flowered plant native only to mountainous parts of Italy. It belongs to the plantain family (Plantaginaceae).

== Description ==
Cymbalaria pallida is a perennial plant, 5–15 centimetres (2.0–5.9 in) high, with a short, pubescent and prostrate-ascending stem and opposite, fleshy, kidney-shaped leaves. Calyx is densely hairy, with rounded lobes; corolla is 8–10 millimetres (0.31–0.39 in) wide, violet-lillac, with white center tinged with yellow and purple and ovate lobes in the lower petals. Spur is cylindrical, 8–10 millimetres (0.31–0.39 in) long. These plants bloom from June to August.

== Distribution ==
This species is endemic to Italy. It can be found in major mountain areas, mainly in the Apennines of Abruzzo, at an elevation of 1,500–2,500 metres (4,900–8,200 ft) above sea level.

== Bibliography ==
- Angiosperm Phylogeny Group, An update of the Angiosperm Phylogeny Group classification for the orders and families of flowering plants: APG III, in Botanical Journal of the Linnean Society 161(2 ): 105–121, 2009, DOI:10.1111/j.1095-8339.2009.00996.x
