= Leadfield, California =

Ghost town in California, United States

Leadfield
- Unincorporated community
- Leadfield buildings and mine dump, 2016

- Location in California
- Coordinates: 36°50′48″N 117°03′33″W
- Country: United States
- State: California
- County: Inyo
- Established: 1925
- Elevation: 4,058 ft (1,237 m)
- Leadfield
- U.S. National Register of Historic Places
- U.S. Historic district
- Location within California Location within the United States
- Location: Death Valley National Park on Titus Canyon Road, Death Valley, California
- Built: 1925
- NRHP reference No.: 75000221
- Added to NRHP: June 10, 1975

Leadfield was an unincorporated community, and historic mining town in Inyo County, California, United States. It is now a ghost town. It is located in Titus Canyon in the Grapevine Mountains, east of Death Valley in Death Valley National Park. Leadfield lies at an elevation of 4,058 ft (1,237 m). It is on the National Register of Historic Places.

== History ==
Ore was being exploited in Titus Canyon as early as 1905, but the townsite of Leadfield at the head of the canyon dates to the years 1925 and 1926. The product of extensive and fraudulent advertising by the Western Lead Mine Company and C.C. Julian, the town boomed in 1925. His advertising posters showed steamboats navigating the Amargosa River to Leadfield, ignoring the fact that the Amargosa River is dry much of the time and does not run within 20 miles of Leadfield.

Fifteen miles of road (the present-day Titus Canyon Road) were built up the canyon to connect with the road to Beatty, Nevada, a concrete foundation for a stamp mill was poured, and the beginning of a series of power poles for electric lines were installed.

Historic photographs show some frame and corrugated metal buildings and there is evidence of a few dugouts, but the majority of the denizens of Leadfield lived in tents of varying sizes and construction. The population peaked at around 300 in 1926, with a post office opening in August of that year. However, by February 1927, the post office closed down and the town died.

Julian disappeared and the inhabitants soon became disillusioned and drifted away. This was an example of the many get-rich-quick schemes of the 1920s. However, the fundamental problem was that the Leadfield ore deposits did not prove sufficiently extensive or profitable to support large-scale operations.

== Visiting ==
The remains of the town include a few rusted metal sheds and two locked, abandoned mine shafts, as of 2016. The town is reachable by the one-way Titus Canyon Road at the eastern end of Titus Canyon, near Beatty, Nevada.

== See also ==
- Death Valley
- List of ghost towns in California
