= Titus Canyon =

Gorge in Death Valley National Park, USA

Coordinates: 36°49′22″N 117°10′24″W

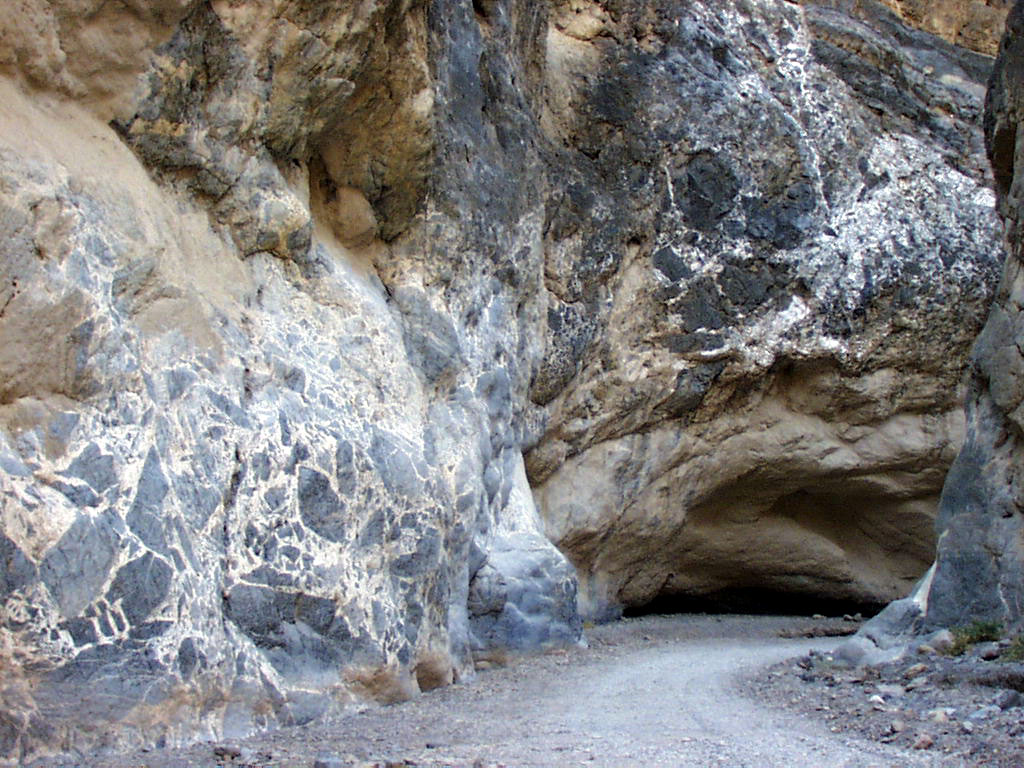
Titus Canyon rock formations

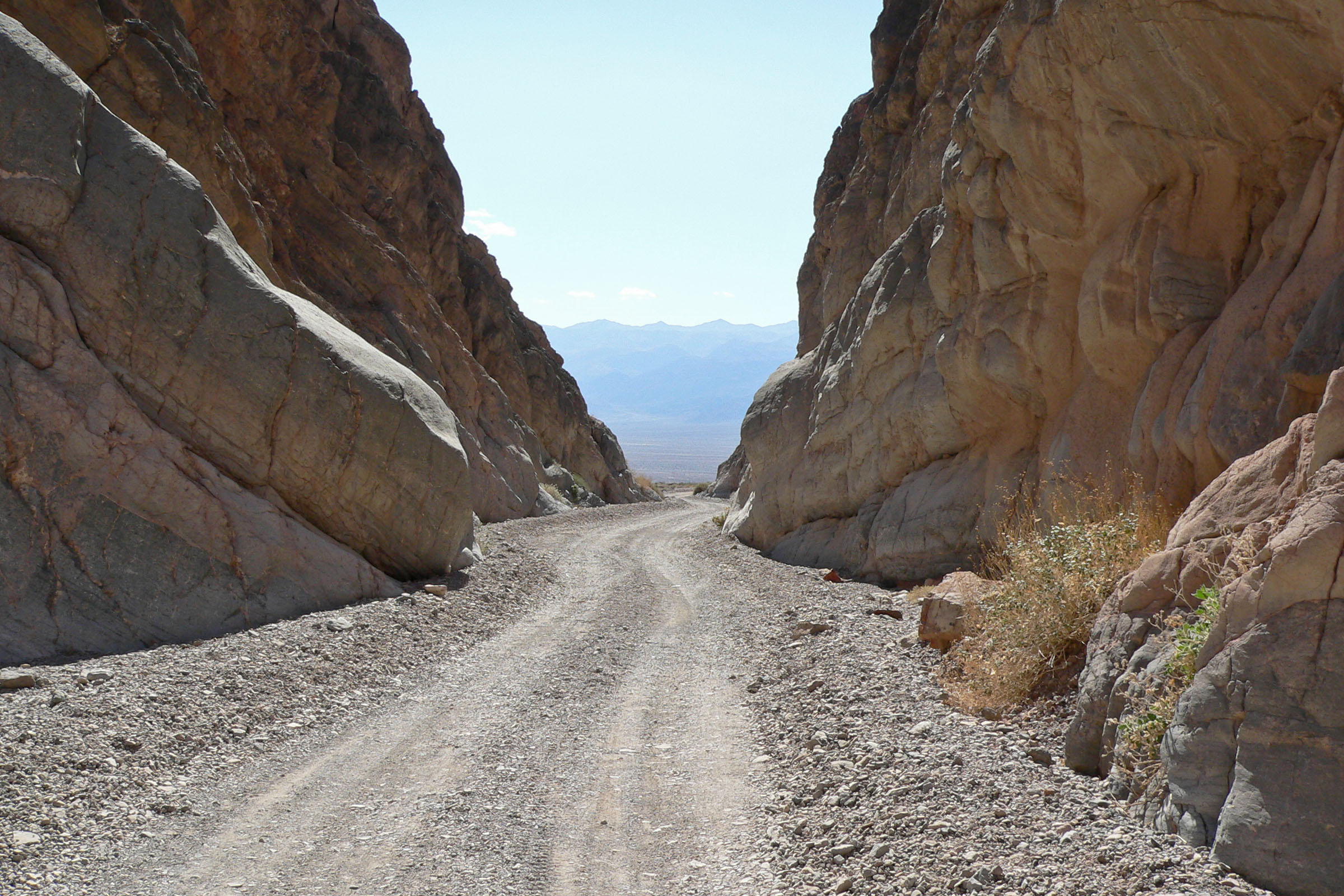
Titus Canyon Road, with view of Death Valley

Titus Canyon is a deep, narrow gorge cut into the steep face of the Grapevine Mountains of the Mojave Desert, within Death Valley National Park in southeastern California and southwestern Nevada. The canyon features limestone rock formations, petroglyphs, and native plants and wildlife.

== Geology ==
Although the Grapevine Mountains were uplifted relatively recently, most of the rocks that make up the range are over half a billion years old. The gray rocks lining the walls of the western end of Titus Canyon are Cambrian age (570–505 million years old) limestone. These ancient Paleozoic rocks formed at a time when the Death Valley area was submerged beneath tropical seas. By the end of the Precambrian, the continental edge of North America had been planed off by erosion to a gently rounded surface of low relief. The rise and fall of the Cambrian seas periodically shifted the shoreline eastward, flooding the continent, then regressed westward, exposing the limestone layers to erosion.

The sediments have since been upturned, upfolded (forming anticlines), downfolded (forming synclines) and folded back onto themselves (forming recumbent folds).

Although some of the limestone exposed in the walls of Titus Canyon originated from thick mats of algae (stromatolites) that thrived in the warm, shallow Death Valley seas, most of the gray limestone shows little structure. Thousands of feet (hundreds of meters) of this limey goo were deposited in the Death Valley region. Similar limestone layers may be seen at Lake Mead National Recreation Area and at the bottom of the Grand Canyon. At one of the bends in the canyon, megabreccia can be seen.

Leadfield buildings and mine dump, 2016

== History ==
Timbisha Native Americans carved petroglyphs on some of the rock faces in Titus Canyon, especially near natural springs.

Ghost towns

Adjacent to the canyon proper is Leadfield, a former mining town and now ghost town where in the 1920s prospectors mined for ore after hearing exaggerated claims that lead would be easy to find and the living conditions in the area would be easy to endure. Another mining town-ghost town dating from the early 20th century, Rhyolite, Nevada, on the Tonopah and Tidewater Railroad, is also nearby to the east.

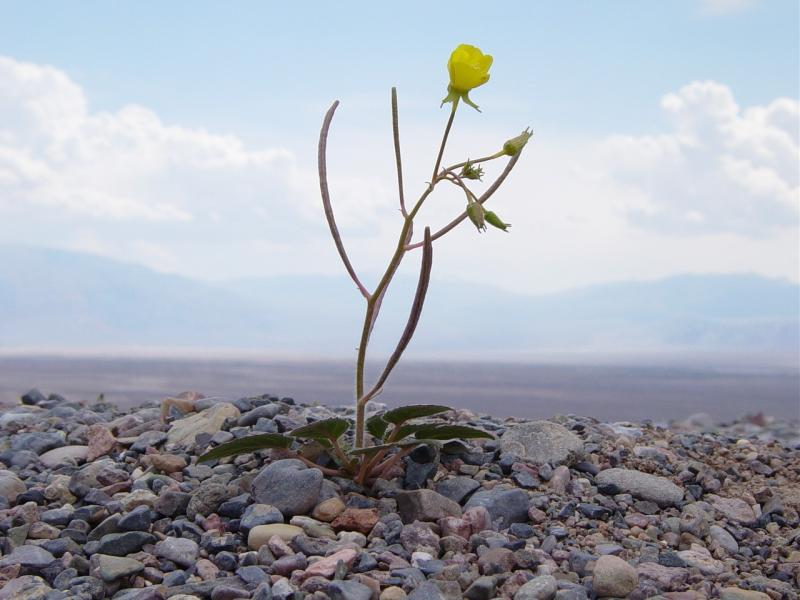
Mojave suncup (Camissonia brevipes) at the mouth of Titus Canyon

== Ecology ==
Several different types of flowering plants, including the sacred datura, inhabit the area. Desert Bighorn Sheep herds live in Titus Canyon, and the Funeral Mountains, particularly in the Klare Spring area of the canyon.

== Access ==
Titus Canyon is located above the east side of Death Valley, within Death Valley National Park. Access by foot from the west via Death Valley, or by vehicles from the east via Nevada. The one-way rough dirt road access begins west of the town of Beatty, Nevada. Vehicle travel is allowed only east to west through Titus Canyon, from the Daylight Pass Road−Nevada Highway 374 on the east, over a pass and down to the mouth of the canyon in Death Valley on the west.

== See also ==
- Places of interest in the Death Valley area
- Death Valley National Park-related topics
- Natural history of the Mojave Desert
- Titus Canyon Visitor Information U.S. National Park Service
