= Asanthus squamulosus =

Scientific classification
- Kingdom: Plantae
- Clade: Tracheophytes
- Clade: Angiosperms
- Clade: Eudicots
- Clade: Asterids
- Order: Asterales
- Family: Asteraceae
- Genus: Asanthus
- Species: A. squamulosus

Binomial name
- Asanthus squamulosus (A.Gray) R.M.King & H.Rob.

Synonyms
- Baccharis squamulosa (A.Gray) M.E.Jones, name not validly published; Brickellia squamulosa A.Gray; Coleosanthus squamulosus (A.Gray) Kuntze; Steviopsis squamulosa (A.Gray) B.L.Turner

Species of flowering plant

Asanthus squamulosus is a North American species of plants in the family Asteraceae. It is native to northern Mexico (Chihuahua, Durango, San Luis Potosí), and the southwestern United States (Arizona, New Mexico). Common name is Mule Mountain false brickellbush.

Asanthus squamulosus is a branching shrub up to 100 cm (40 inches) tall. Flower heads have whitish disc florets but no ray florets. It grows in flats, creekbanks, and gravelly areas, often in pine-oak woodlands.
