= Asanthus =

Scientific classification
- Kingdom: Plantae
- Clade: Embryophytes
- Clade: Tracheophytes
- Clade: Angiosperms
- Clade: Eudicots
- Clade: Asterids
- Order: Asterales
- Family: Asteraceae
- Subfamily: Asteroideae
- Tribe: Eupatorieae
- Genus: Asanthus; R.M.King & H.Rob.

Genus of flowering plants

Asanthus is a small genus of flowering plants in the family Asteraceae, found only in northern Mexico and the southwestern United States.

Each of the species was originally named as a member of Brickellia, and later transferred when King and Robinson named the genus. Asanthus and Brickellia both have cypsela (achenes) with 10 ribs, but in Asanthus the style is glabrous and narrow at the base whereas in Brickellia the style has a pubescent, enlarged base. Molecular phylogenetic analysis has provided support that the two genera represent phylogenetically distinct lineages and thus should be recognized as distinct.

The genus is named for American botanist Asa Gray, 1810–1888. His name is added to the Greek word "anthos" meaning "flower."

Species

- Asanthus solidaginifolius (A.Gray) R.M.King & H.Rob. - Chihuahua, Durango
- Asanthus squamulosus (A.Gray) R.M.King & H.Rob. - Chihuahua, Durango, San Luis Potosí, Arizona, New Mexico
- Asanthus thyrsiflorus (A.Gray) R.M.King & H.Rob. (misspelled as Asanthus thrysiflorus when first published) - San Luis Potosí, Coahuila, Chihuahua, Zacatecas, Durango, Jalisco, Aguascalientes
