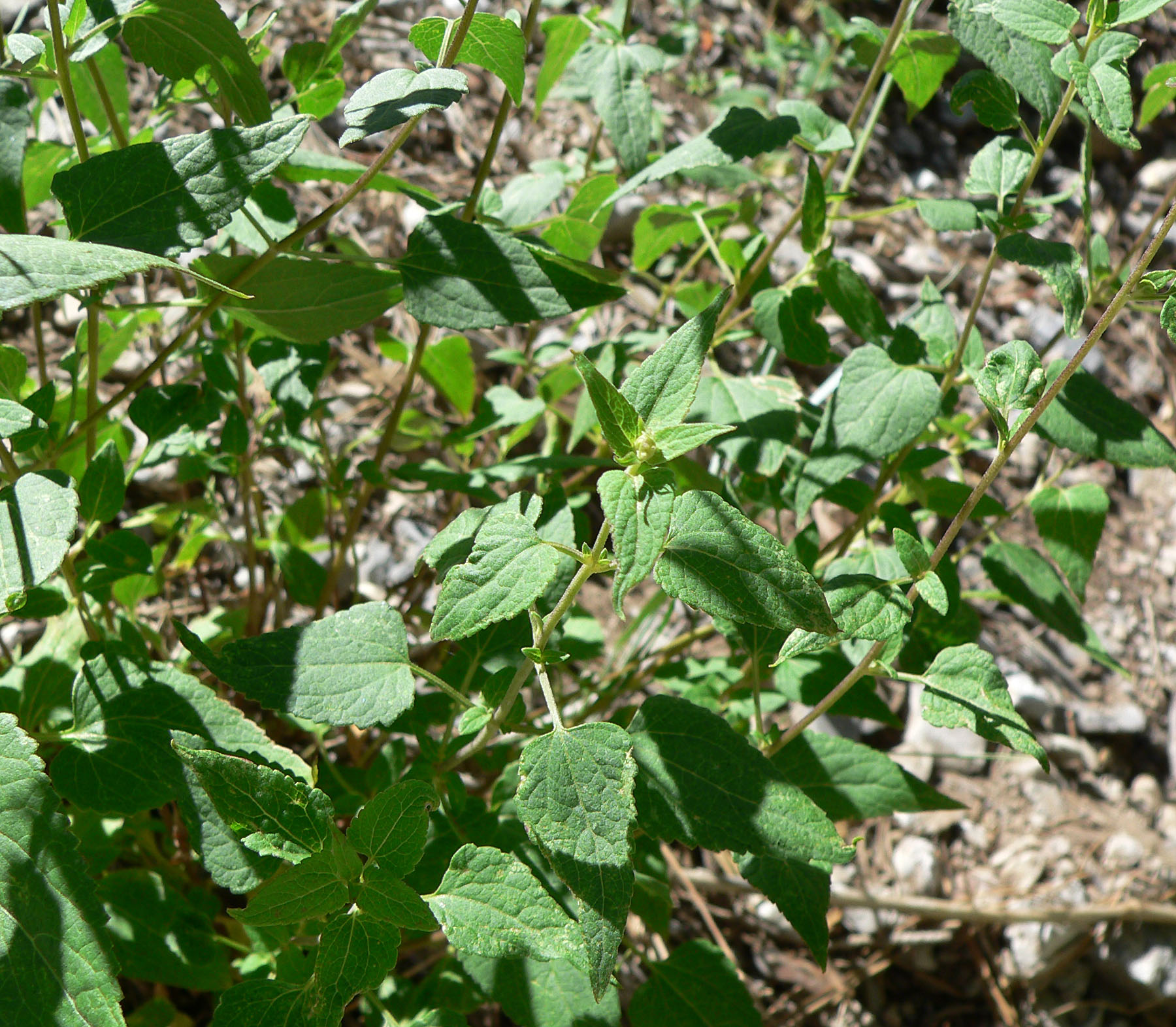

Conservation status
- Secure (NatureServe)

Scientific classification
- Kingdom: Plantae
- Clade: Tracheophytes
- Clade: Angiosperms
- Clade: Eudicots
- Clade: Asterids
- Order: Asterales
- Family: Asteraceae
- Genus: Brickellia
- Species: B. grandiflora

Binomial name
- Brickellia grandiflora (Hook.) Nutt.

Synonyms
- Synonymy: Brickellia umbellata (Greene) Rydb.; Coleosanthus congestus A.Nelson; Coleosanthus garrettii Nelson; Coleosanthus gracilipes Greene; Coleosanthus grandiflorus (Hook.) Kuntze; Coleosanthus minor (A.Gray) Daniels; Coleosanthus petiolaris (A.Gray) Greene; Coleosanthus populifolius Greene; Coleosanthus umbellatus Greene; Eupatorium grandiflorum Hook.

= Brickellia grandiflora =

Species of flowering plant

Brickellia grandiflora, known by the common name tasselflower brickellbush, is a species of flowering plant in the family Asteraceae.

== Description ==
Brickellia grandiflora is an upright perennial herb growing a few-branched stem up to 70 centimeters (28 inches) tall. The hairy, glandular leaves are up to 12 cm (4 3/4 in) long and lance-shaped, triangular, or heart-shaped.

The inflorescences at the tip of the slender stem holds clusters of nodding flower heads, each just over 1 cm long and lined with greenish phyllaries with curling tips. The bell-shaped flower head holds a spreading array of 20 to 40 disc florets. The fruit is a hairy cylindrical achene about 4 millimeters (1/8 in) long with a pappus of bristles. The bloom period is July to October.

The rust fungus Puccinia subdecora grows on Brickellia grandiflora.

== Distribution and habitat ==
The plant is widespread across much of western North America, found in western Canada (Alberta, British Columbia); northern Mexico (Baja California, Sonora, Chihuahua, Coahuila, Nuevo León, Tamaulipas); and the western and midwestern United States (primarily the Rocky Mountains and regions west through California, Oregon and Washington, with additional populations in New Mexico and Texas, and the central Great Plains (Nebraska, Kansas, Oklahoma) and the Ozarks (Missouri, Arkansas).

It can be found on forest banks and cliffs at relatively high elevations.
