= Asanthus solidaginifolius =

Scientific classification
- Kingdom: Plantae
- Clade: Tracheophytes
- Clade: Angiosperms
- Clade: Eudicots
- Clade: Asterids
- Order: Asterales
- Family: Asteraceae
- Genus: Asanthus
- Species: A. solidaginifolius

Binomial name
- Asanthus solidaginifolius (A.Gray) R.M.King & H.Rob.

Synonyms
- Brickellia solidaginifolia A.Gray; Steviopsis thyrsiflora var. solidaginifolia (A.Gray) B.L.Turner

Species of flowering plant

Asanthus solidaginifolius is a Mexican species of plants in the family Asteraceae. It is native to the states of Chihuahua and Durango in north-central Mexico.
