= Asanthus thyrsiflorus =

Scientific classification
- Kingdom: Plantae
- Clade: Tracheophytes
- Clade: Angiosperms
- Clade: Eudicots
- Clade: Asterids
- Order: Asterales
- Family: Asteraceae
- Genus: Asanthus
- Species: A. thyrsiflorus

Binomial name
- Asanthus thyrsiflorus (A.Gray) R.M.King & H.Rob.

Synonyms
- Asanthus thrysiflorus (A.Gray) R.M.King & H.Rob., typographical error; Brickellia thyrsiflora A.Gray; Coleosanthus thyrsiflorus (A.Gray) Kuntze; Steviopsis thyrsiflora (A.Gray) B.L.Turner

Species of flowering plant

Asanthus thyrsiflorus is a Mexican species of plants in the family Asteraceae. It is native to the states of San Luis Potosí, Chihuahua, Zacatecas, Aguascalientes, Jalisco, Coahuila, and Durango in north-central Mexico.

Asanthus thyrsiflorus is a branching shrub up to 100 cm (40 inches) tall. Flower heads have whitish disc florets but no ray florets. It grows in flats, creekbanks, and gravelly areas, often in pine-oak woodlands.
