= Billie Lee Turner (botanist) =

American botanist (1925–2020)

Billie Lee Turner (February 22, 1925 – May 27, 2020) was an American botanist and professor of botany at the University of Texas at Austin where he also directed the botany research programme and herbarium.

He died from COVID-19 in Round Rock, Texas, during the COVID-19 pandemic in Texas.

== Biography ==
Born in Yoakum, Texas, Turner lived almost his entire life in Texas, apart from military service and attending graduate school. He was schooled in Texas City from 1939, graduating in 1943 and enlisting in the US Army, transferred to the Army Air Corp and navigation school, becoming second lieutenant. In 1945 he joined the 15th Air Force division at the Giulia Airfield in Cerignola, Italy. He was awarded the Purple Heart when he was injured in a sortie over Brenner Pass. During the post war occupation, he was stationed in Heidelberg and Straubing, Germany as First Lieutenant, and finally in El Paso, Texas.

He received his B.S. in Biology from Sul Ross State University in 1949 and later obtained his M.S from Southern Methodist University and his Ph.D. from Washington State University. All his studies were covered by the G.I. Bill. Turner joined the University of Texas at Austin as Instructor 1953, becoming full professor in 1961. He was chair of the department from 1967 to 1974, and Director of the Herbarium (TEX) from 1967 to 1998. Late in his life, the herbarium was renamed the Billie L. Turner Plant Resources Center. In 1993, he arranged an endowment named after Dr. George M. Hocking to support the collection of floristic texts at the University of Texas at Austin Libraries.

He was married three times, and was the father of two sons (including the geographer Billie Lee Turner II) and adopted father of two more. Obituaries report his behavior occasionally led him into difficulty at the University of Texas, and several efforts were made to have him fired.

== Research ==
Turner's main interest was spermatophyte plants. He worked extensively on the flora of Mexico. He focused on the composites and legumes. Plants named in his honor include the genus Billieturnera and the species Lophospermum turneri. His last research article was in 2010 and book in 2015. His research career spanned 60 years, with over 700 publications.

== Books ==
- Vegetational Changes in Africa over a Third of a Century (1958) with Homer Leroy Shantz
- The Legumes of Texas (1959),
- The Atlas of the Vascular Plants of Texas(2003) Turner et al
- Biochemical Systematics (1963) with Ralph Alston
- Plant Chemosystematics (1984) with J. B. Harborne
- The Comps of Mexico; A Systematic Account of the Family Asteraceae, 1996—2017, in 27 volumes
