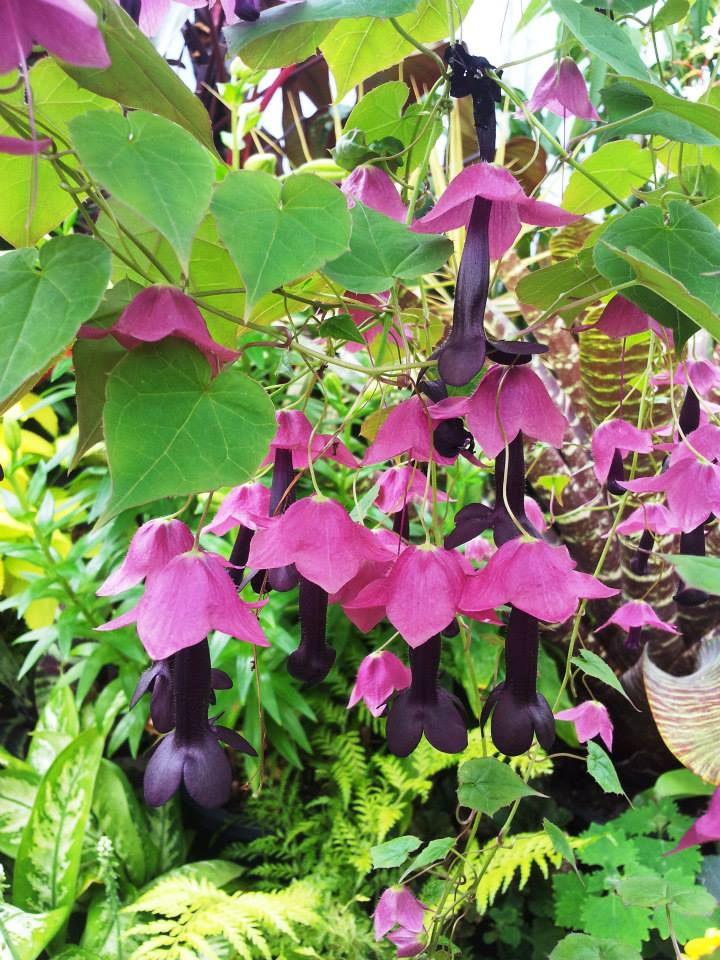
- In cultivation

Scientific classification
- Kingdom: Plantae
- Clade: Tracheophytes
- Clade: Angiosperms
- Clade: Eudicots
- Clade: Asterids
- Order: Lamiales
- Family: Plantaginaceae
- Genus: Rhodochiton
- Species: R. atrosanguineus

Binomial name
- Rhodochiton atrosanguineus (Zucc.) Rothm.

Synonyms
- Lophospermum atrosanguineum Zucc.; Lophospermum rhodochiton D.Don; Maurandya atrosanguinea (Zucc.) G.Nicholson; Rhodochiton volubilis Zucc. ex Otto & A.Dietr., nom. illeg.

= Rhodochiton atrosanguineus =

Species of flowering plant

Rhodochiton atrosanguineus is a herbaceous perennial vine native to Mexico. It has been cultivated as an ornamental plant since at least 1836.

Although the specific epithet is sometimes spelled atrosanguineum, chiton in Greek is masculine, so the ending is correctly -us.

Rhodochiton atrosanguineus has been known colloquially in the UK as the "black man's willy". Another common name is purple bell vine or simply purple bell.

All Rhodochiton species are sometimes placed in the genus Lophospermum.

== Description ==
Its dangling flowers have a pink, bell-shaped calyx of sepals surrounding a protruding, tubular corolla of purple-black petals. It has somewhat hairy, heart-shaped leaves, often with purple venation. The vine can reach three metres in length in perfect conditions, but more-likely 1.5-2.5 metres. The seeds are 3mm across.

== Taxonomic history ==
Wayne J. Elisens has outlined the somewhat confused taxonomic history of the name of this species. In 1829, Joseph Gerhard Zuccarini sent seeds and a description to individuals and botanical gardens under the name "Rhodochiton volubile", considering it to be a new genus; however the name was not formally published. In 1832, Zuccarini decided that it was actually a Lophospermum, and published the name Lophospermum atrosanguineum, writing that "I held it at first to be new genus and sent the seeds obtained in the summer of 1829 to several gardens under the name Rhodochiton volubile. The figure in the Botanical Register has convinced me of the identity of the genus." Not knowing of Zuccharini's change of name, in particular his publication of the epithet atrosanguineum, in 1834 Christoph Friedrich Otto and Albert Gottfried Dietrich published and illustrated Rhodochiton volubilis, an illegitimate name since a prior epithet existed. (Note: The name as published originally was Rhodochiton volubile. However, chiton in Greek is masculine, so the epithet should be volubilis. The International Code of Nomenclature for algae, fungi, and plants requires incorrect genders to be corrected.) In 1943, Rothmaler provided a legitimate combination in the genus Rhodochiton, namely Rhodochiton atrosanguineus. (Note: The name as published originally was Rhodochiton atrosanguineum, but as noted above it should be corrected to Rhodochiton atrosanguineus.)

== Cultivation ==
Rhodochiton atrosanguineus has gained the Royal Horticultural Society's Award of Garden Merit.

This plant is undemanding if given full sun or near-full sun, well-drained soil, and general care. It will tolerate cold temperatures, but not freezing.

Propagation is by seed sown in spring, or at 15-18 °C.

Plants can be pruned in late winter to manage size and shape.

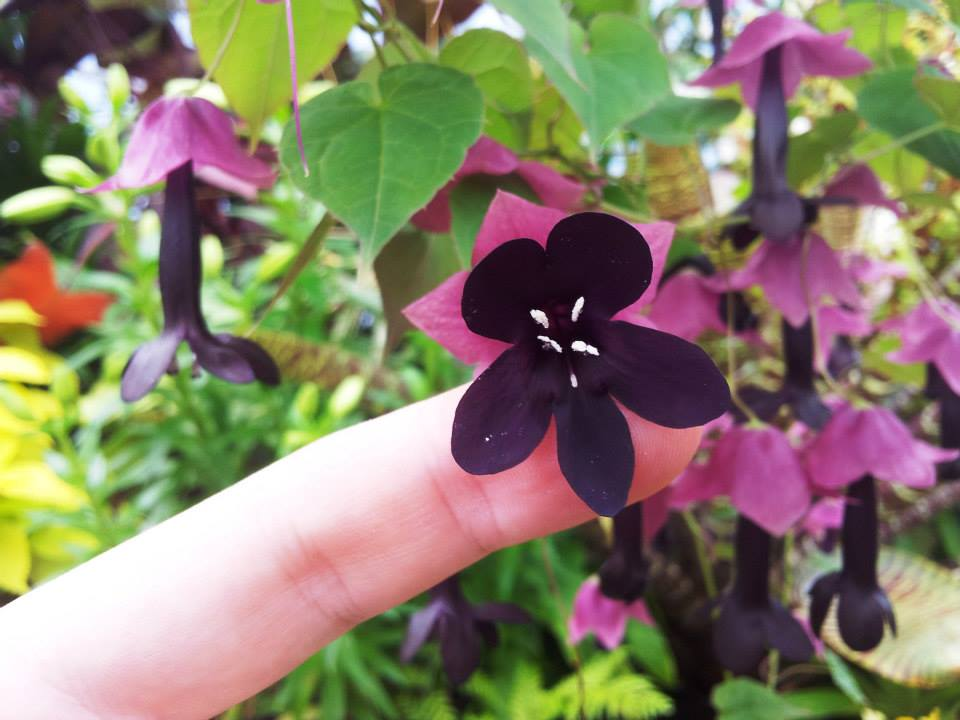
Flower from underneath

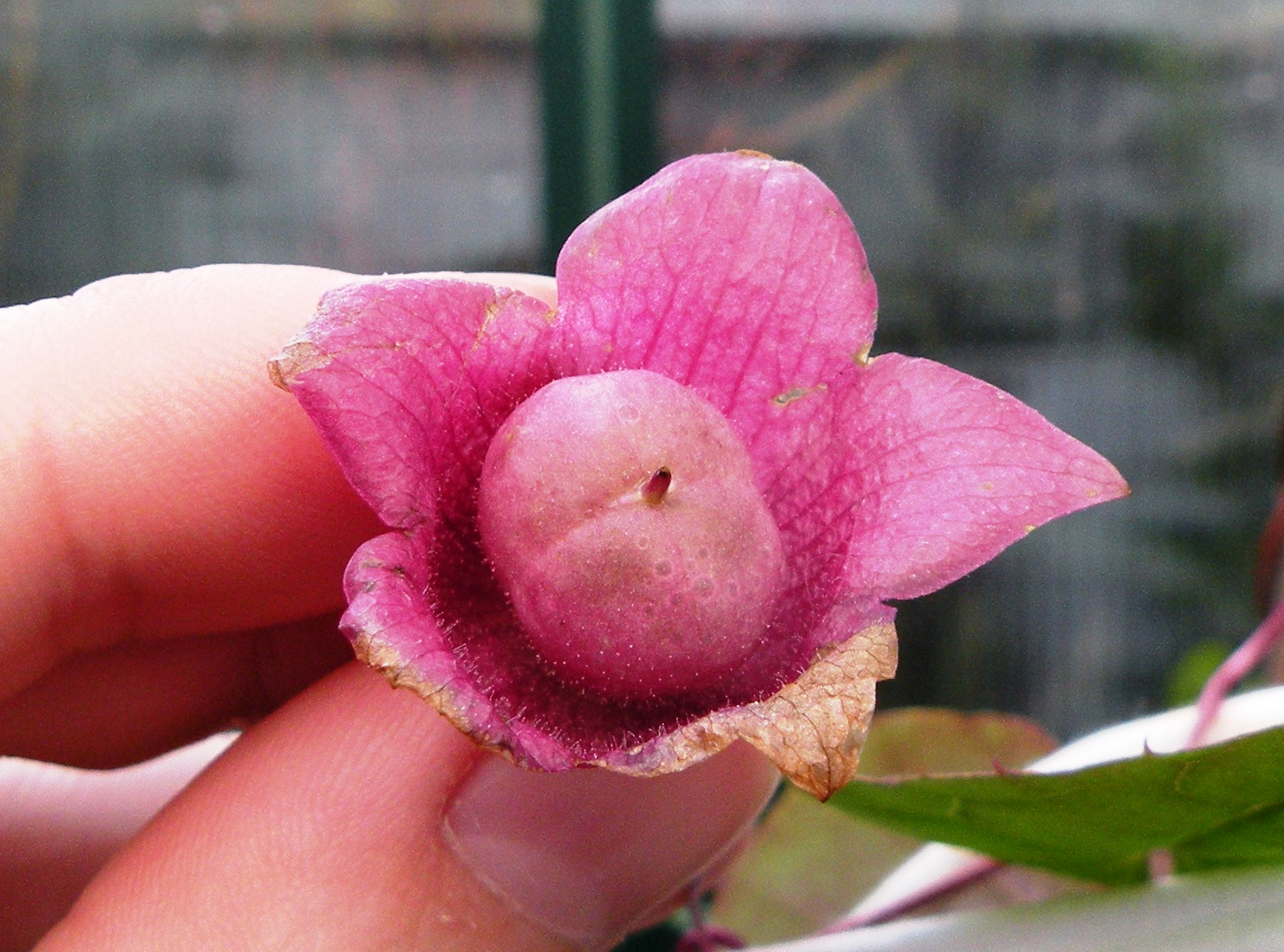
Developing seed pod

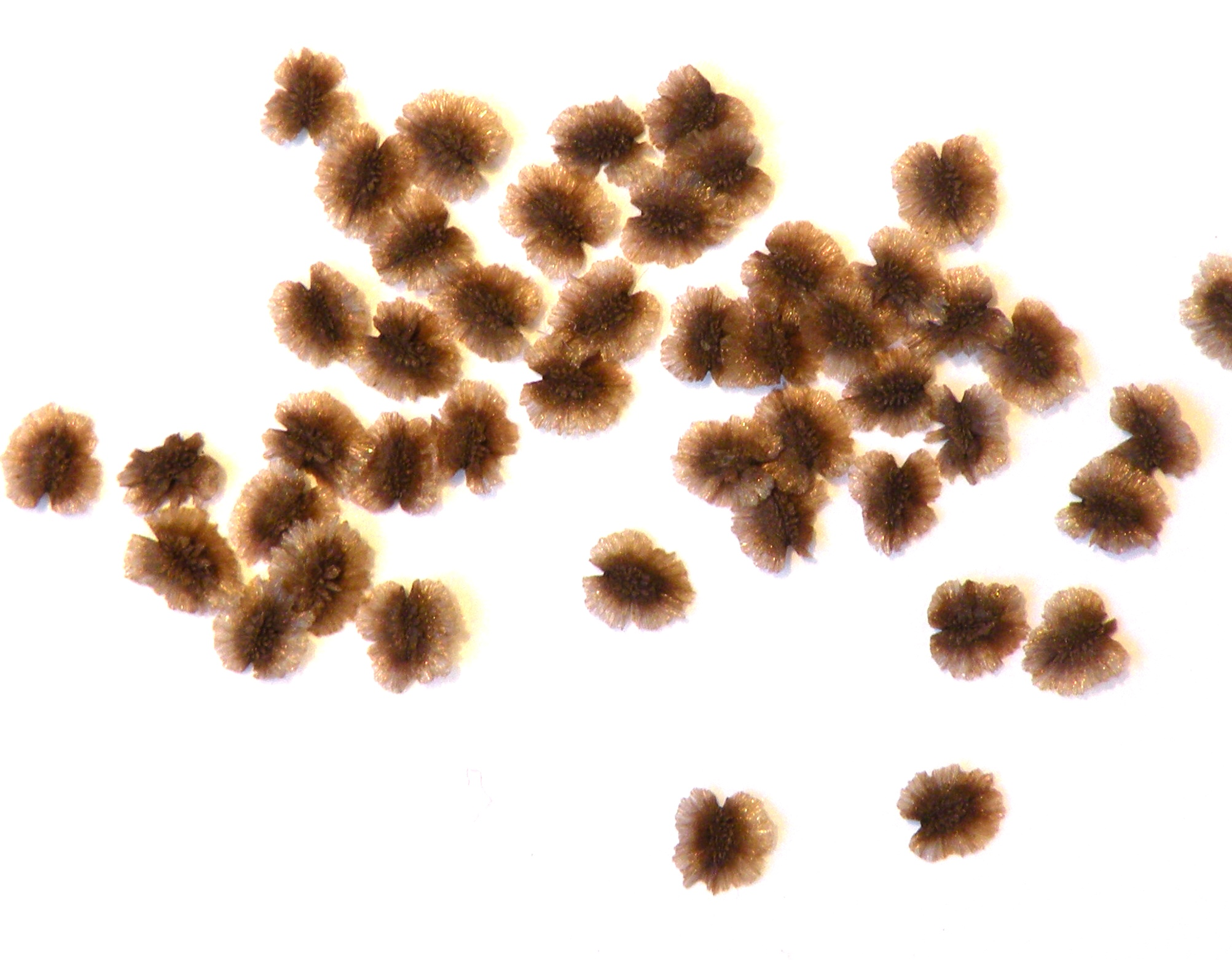
Seeds (3mm across)
