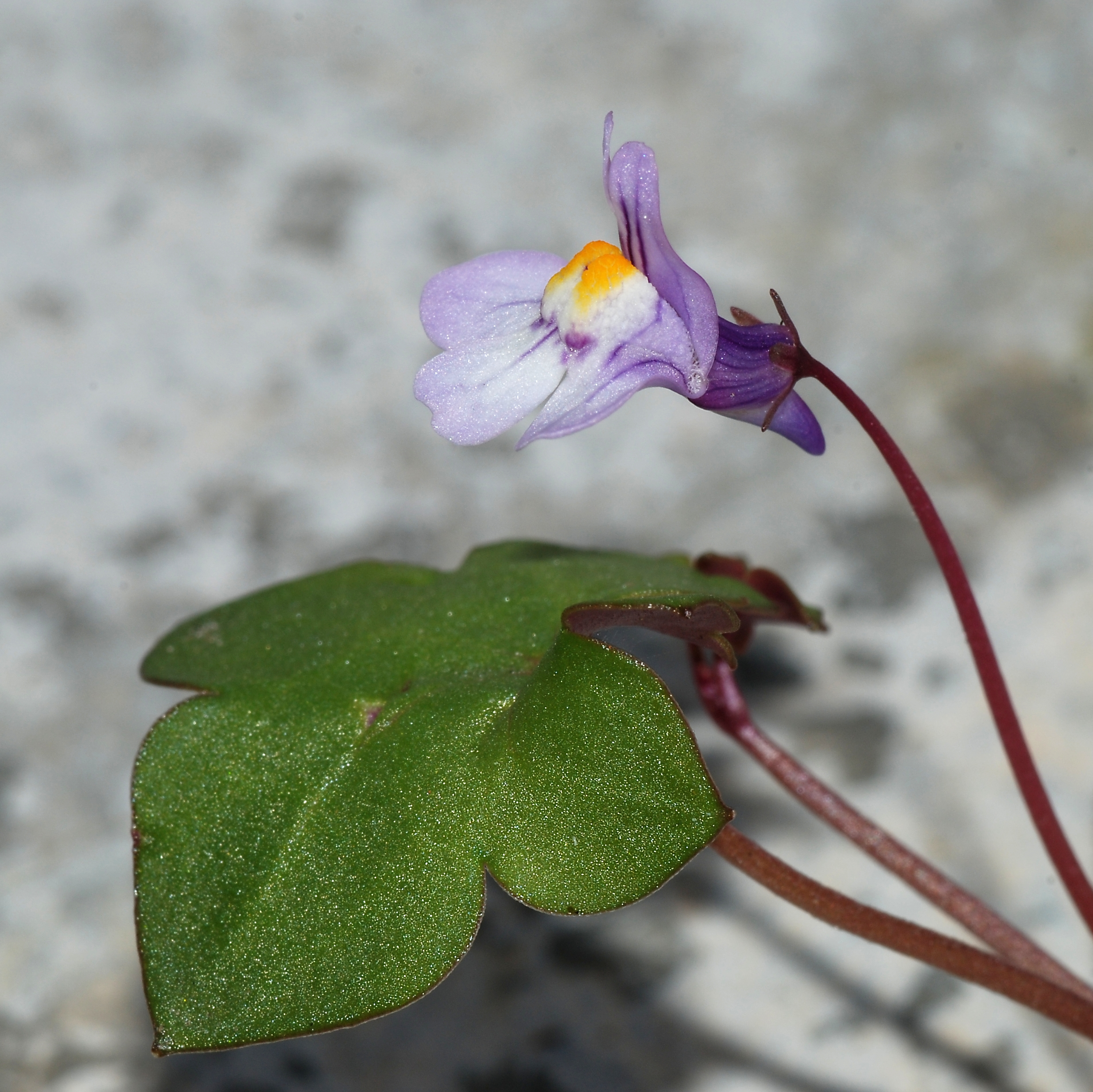
- Cymbalaria muralis (ivy-leaved toadflax)

Scientific classification
- Kingdom: Plantae
- Clade: Embryophytes
- Clade: Tracheophytes
- Clade: Angiosperms
- Clade: Eudicots
- Clade: Asterids
- Order: Lamiales
- Family: Plantaginaceae
- Tribe: Antirrhineae
- Genus: Cymbalaria; Hill

= Cymbalaria =

Genus of flowering plants in the plantain family

Cymbalaria is a genus of about 10 species of herbaceous perennial plants previously placed in the family Scrophulariaceae, but recently shown by genetic research to be in the much enlarged family Plantaginaceae.

The genus is native to southern Europe. It is closely related to the genera Linaria and Antirrhinum, differing in having creeping growth and flowers borne singly rather than in dense erect spikes. The common name toadflax is shared with Linaria and other related genera. The scientific name means "resembling a cymbal" for the somewhat rounded leaves.

By far the best known species is Cymbalaria muralis (also called ivy-leaved toadflax, and Kenilworth ivy), native to southwest Europe. It has widely naturalised elsewhere and is commonly sold as a garden plant. C. muralis characteristically grows in sheltered crevices in walls and pathways, or in rocks and scree, making a trailing or scrambling plant up to 1 m (3 ft 3 in) long.

== Species list ==
Accepted species are:

- Cymbalaria aequitriloba (Viv.) A.Chev.
- Cymbalaria bakhtiarica Podlech & Iranshahr
- Cymbalaria glutinosa Bigazzi & Raffaelli
- Cymbalaria hepaticifolia (Poir.) Wettst.
- Cymbalaria longipes (Boiss. & Heldr.) A.Chev.
- Cymbalaria microcalyx (Boiss.) Wettst.
- Cymbalaria muelleri (Moris) A.Chev.
- Cymbalaria muralis G.Gaertn., B.Mey. & Schreb.
- Cymbalaria pallida (Ten.) Wettst.
- Cymbalaria pluttula (Rech.f.) Speta
- Cymbalaria pubescens (J.Presl & C.Presl) Cufod.

== Taxonomy ==
Described as Cymbalaria by the English botanist, John Hill in 1756.

== Gallery ==
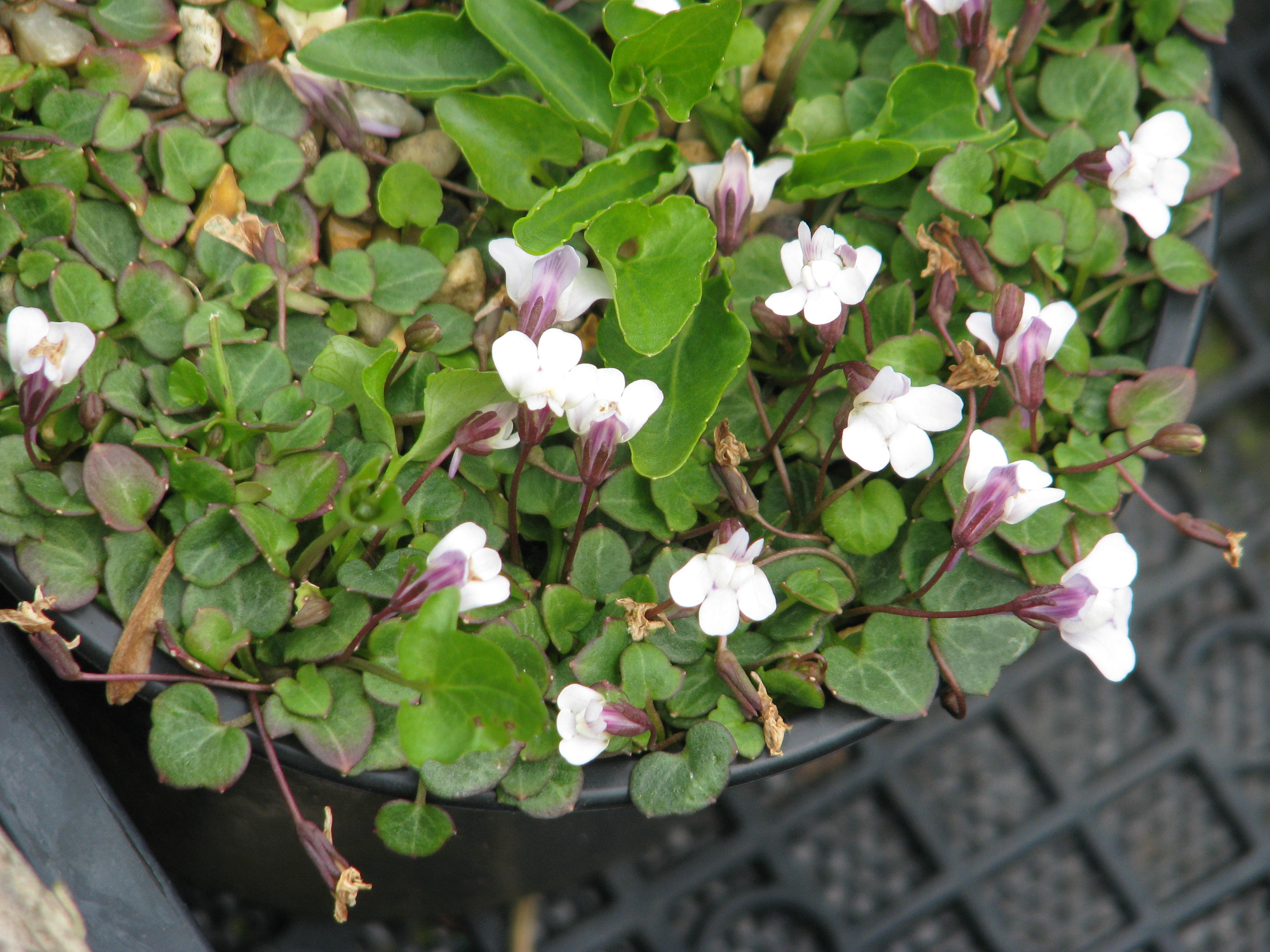
Cymbalaria hepaticifolia

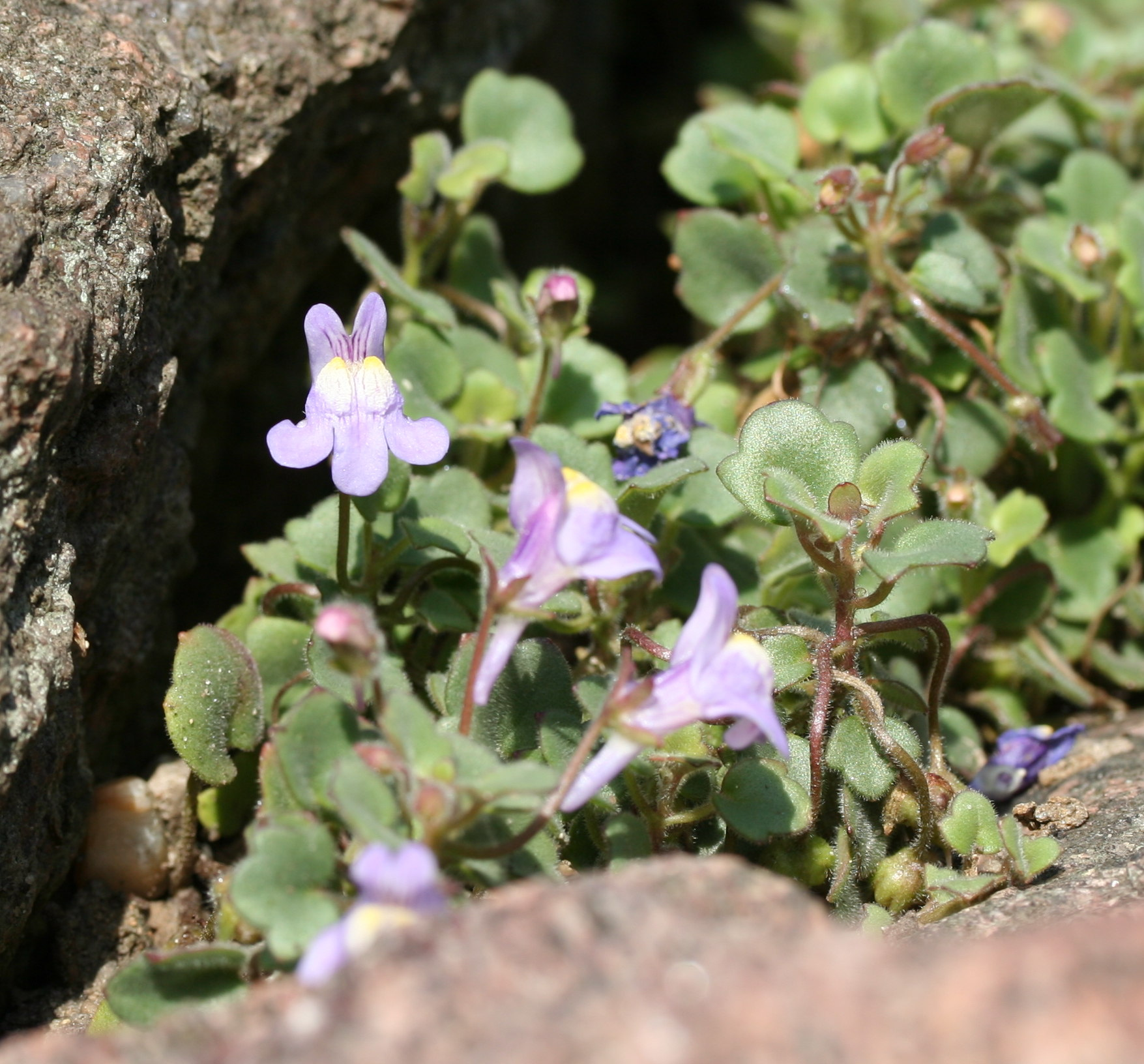
Cymbalaria pallida

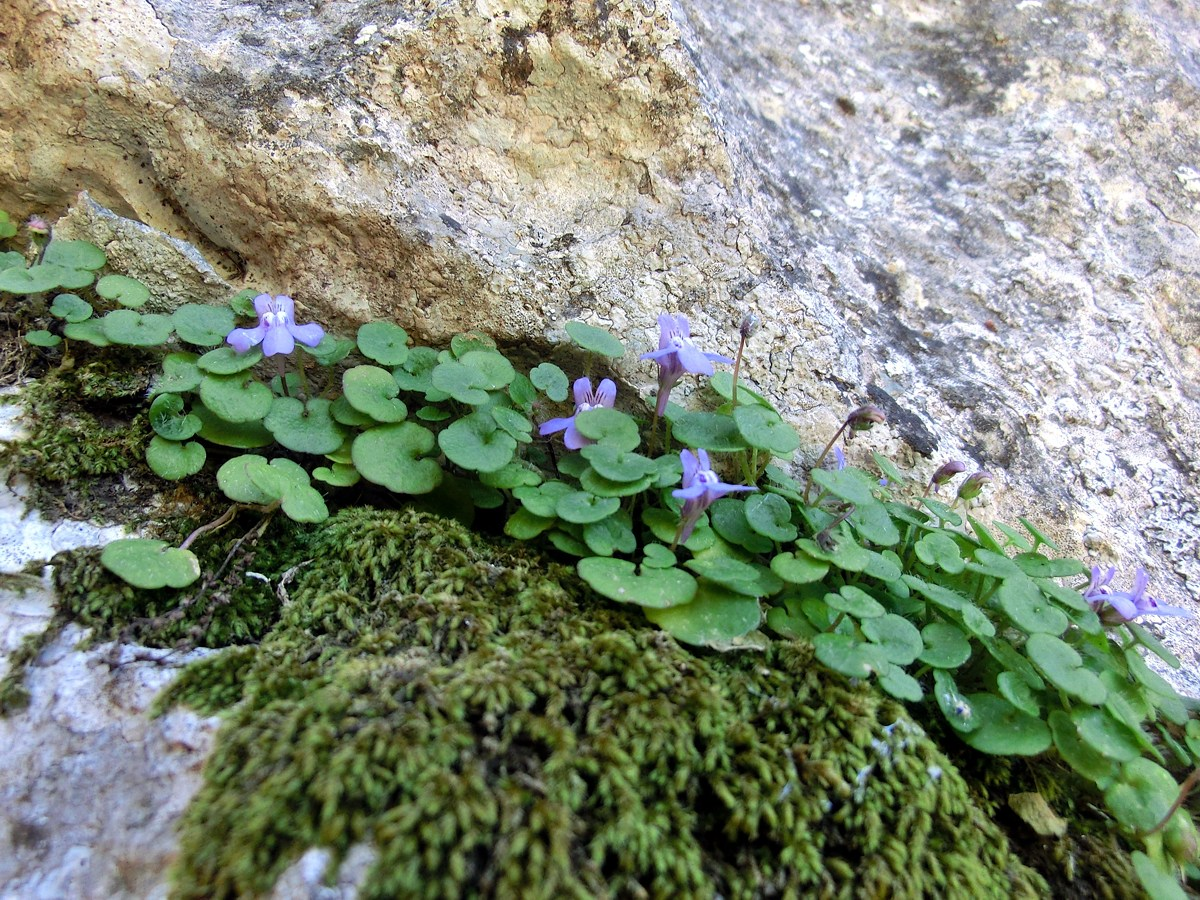
Cymbalaria aequitriloba

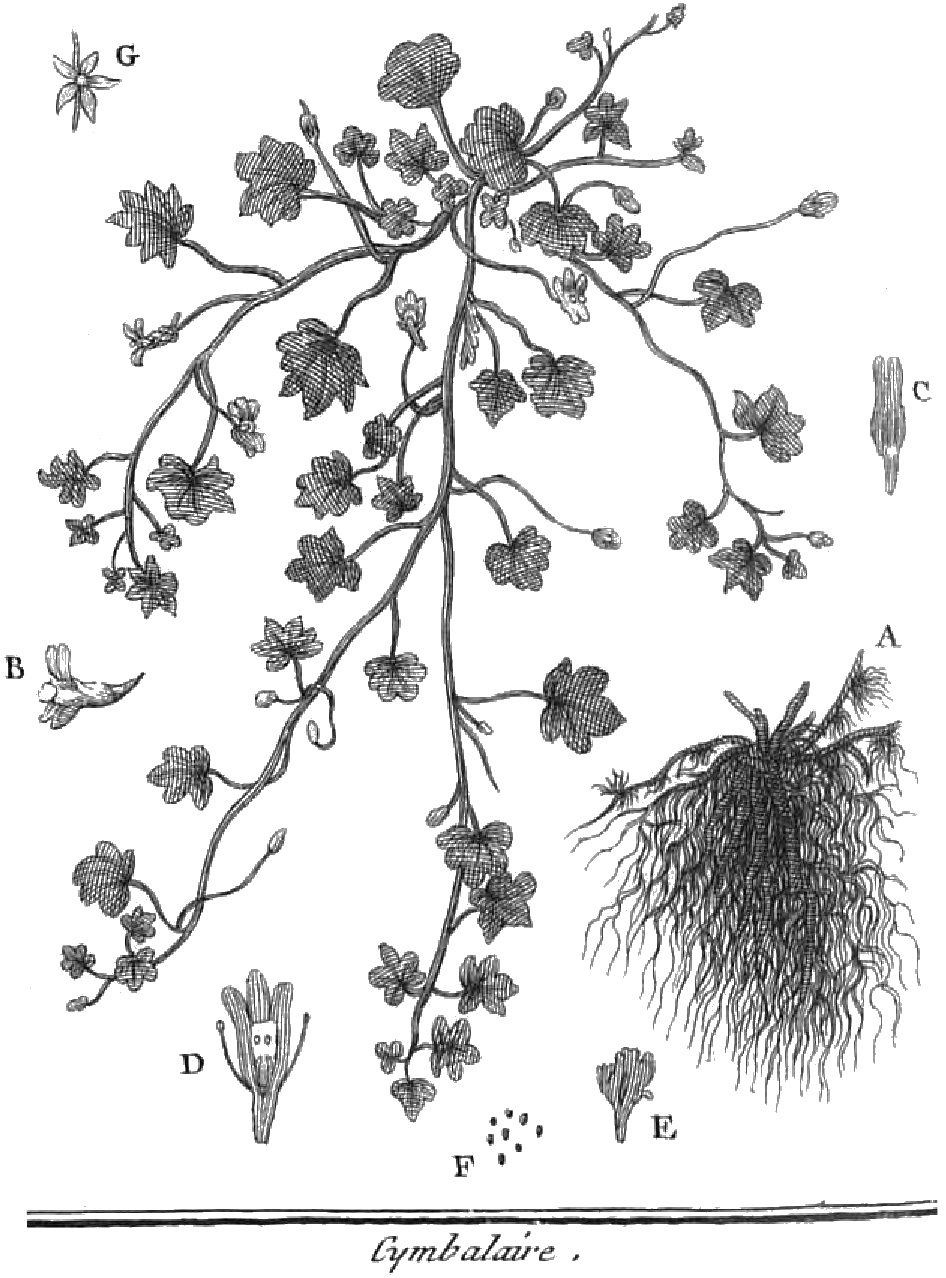
Cymbalaria

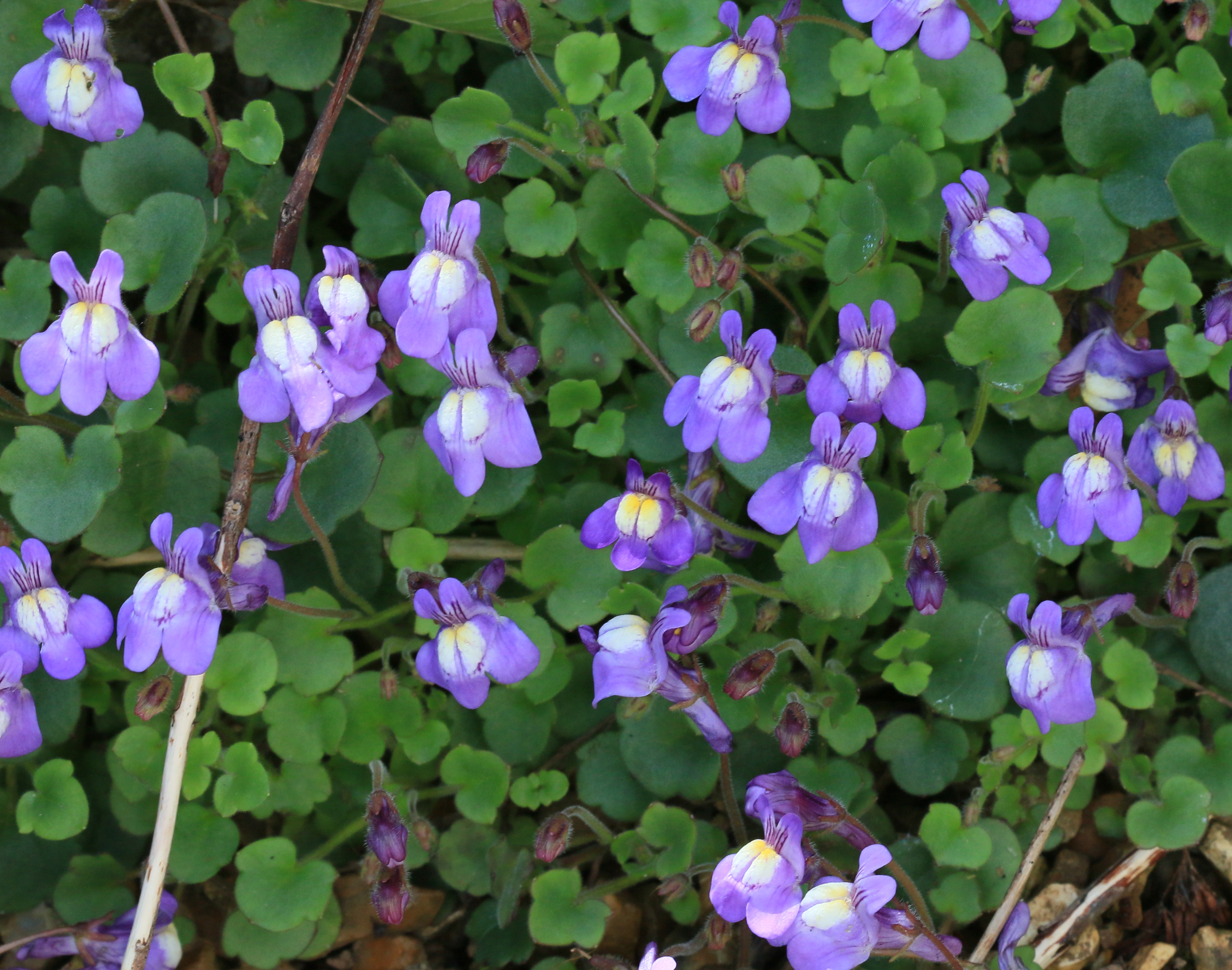
Cymbalaria sp.
