= Lepidoneura =

Scientific classification
- Domain: Eukaryota
- Kingdom: Animalia
- Phylum: Arthropoda
- Class: Insecta
- Order: Lepidoptera
- Family: Crambidae
- Subfamily: Spilomelinae
- Genus: Lepidoneura; Hampson, 1896

Genus of moths

Lepidoneura is a genus of moths of the family Crambidae.

== Species ==
- Lepidoneura africalis Hampson, 1899
- Lepidoneura grisealis Hampson, 1900

== Former species ==
- Lepidoneura longipalpis Swinhoe, 1894
