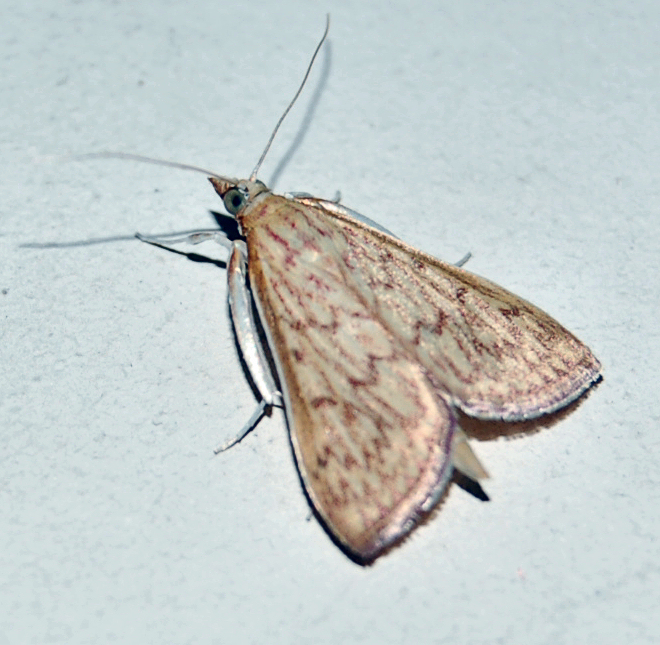

Scientific classification
- Kingdom: Animalia
- Phylum: Arthropoda
- Class: Insecta
- Order: Lepidoptera
- Family: Crambidae
- Genus: Antigastra
- Species: A. catalaunalis

Binomial name
- Antigastra catalaunalis (Duponchel, 1833)

Synonyms
- Botys catalaunalis Duponchel, 1833; Antigastra catalaunalis ab. sionensis Caradja, 1929; Botys venosalis Walker, 1866

= Antigastra catalaunalis =

Species of moth

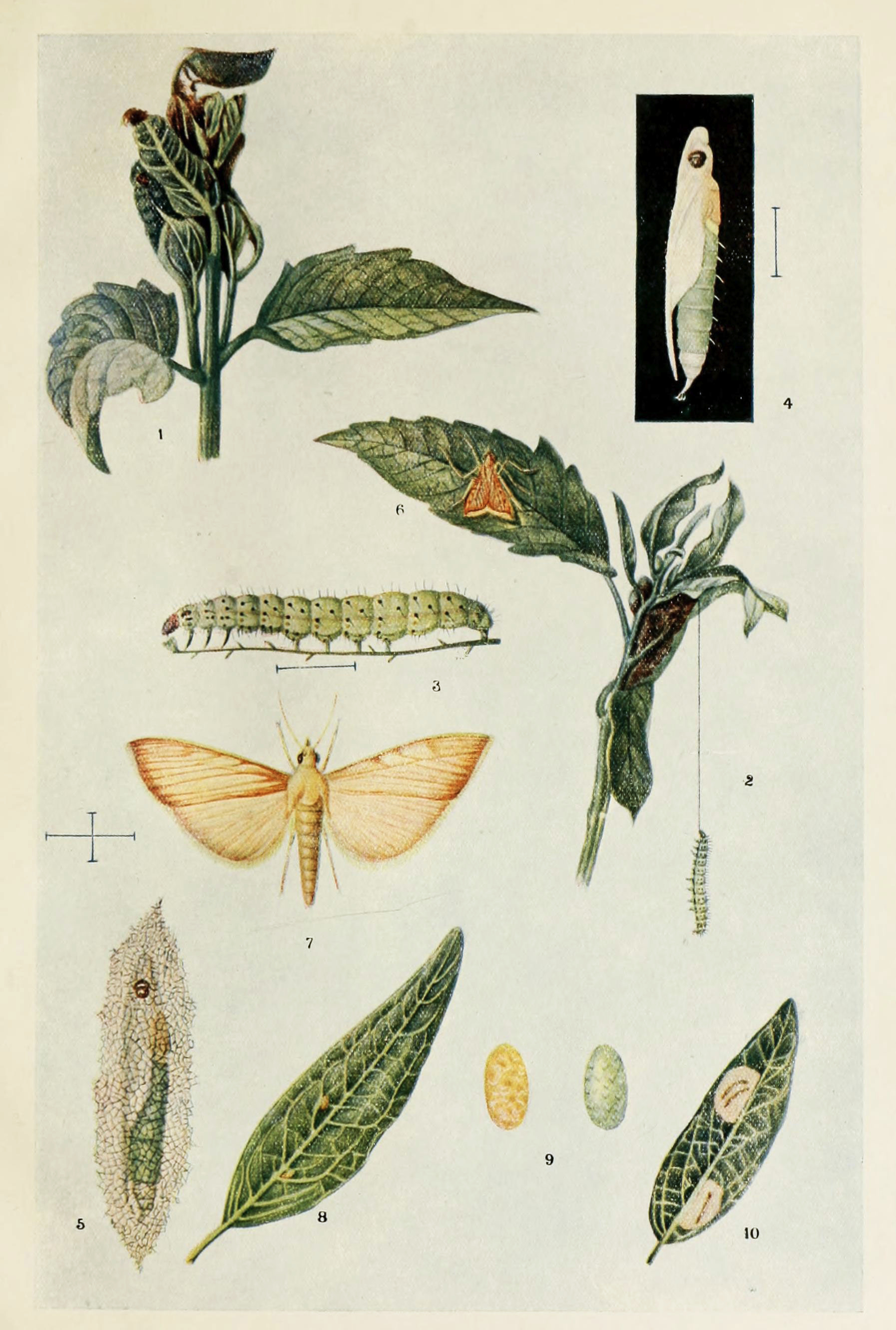
Image by Harold Maxwell-Lefroy

Antigastra catalaunalis is a species of moth of the family Crambidae. The species was first described by Philogène Auguste Joseph Duponchel in 1833. It is endemic to tropical and subtropical areas (South Asia, Malay Archipelago, Africa), but is also found in other areas due to its migratory nature.

== Description ==
The wingspan is 19–22 mm. The forewings are pale yellow, veins and margins suffused with ferruginous, sometimes almost obscuring ground-colour; lines ferruginous, second strongly curved outwards on upper 2/3; small orbicular and discal spot fuscous; cilia whitish, base dark fuscous. Hindwings are yellow whitish, ferruginous-tinged, termen more ferruginous; a cloudy grey postmedian costal spot. See also Parsons et al.

The larvae feed on snapdragons (Antirrhinum species), common toadflax (Linaria vulgaris), trumpetbush (Tecoma species), Scrophulariaceae and Pedaliaceae species.
