= Lepidoneura grisealis =

Scientific classification
- Kingdom: Animalia
- Phylum: Arthropoda
- Class: Insecta
- Order: Lepidoptera
- Family: Crambidae
- Genus: Lepidoneura
- Species: L. grisealis

Binomial name
- Lepidoneura grisealis Hampson, 1900

Species of moth

Lepidoneura grisealis is a moth in the family Crambidae. It was described by George Hampson in 1900. It is found in Xinjiang, China.
