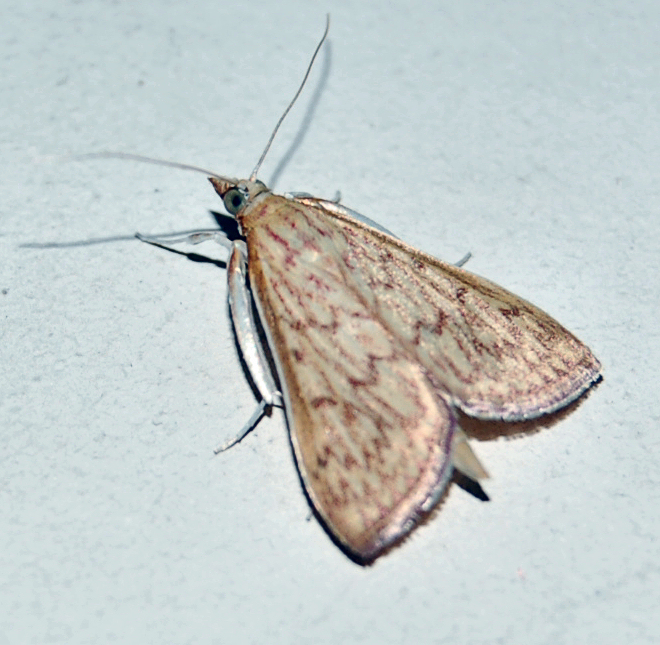
- Antigastra catalaunalis

Scientific classification
- Kingdom: Animalia
- Phylum: Arthropoda
- Clade: Pancrustacea
- Class: Insecta
- Order: Lepidoptera
- Family: Crambidae
- Subfamily: Spilomelinae
- Tribe: Margaroniini
- Genus: Antigastra; Lederer, 1863

= Antigastra =

Genus of moths

Antigastra is a genus of moths of the family Crambidae.

== Species ==
- Antigastra catalaunalis (Duponchel, 1833)
- Antigastra morysalis (Walker, 1859)

[?]

- Antigastra longipalpis Swinhoe, 1894

but see under *Lepidoneura longipalpis (Swinhoe, 1894)
