= Lepidoneura africalis =

Scientific classification
- Kingdom: Animalia
- Phylum: Arthropoda
- Class: Insecta
- Order: Lepidoptera
- Family: Crambidae
- Genus: Lepidoneura
- Species: L. africalis

Binomial name
- Lepidoneura africalis Hampson, 1899

Species of moth

Lepidoneura africalis is a moth in the family Crambidae. It was described by George Hampson in 1899. It is found in the Gambia.
