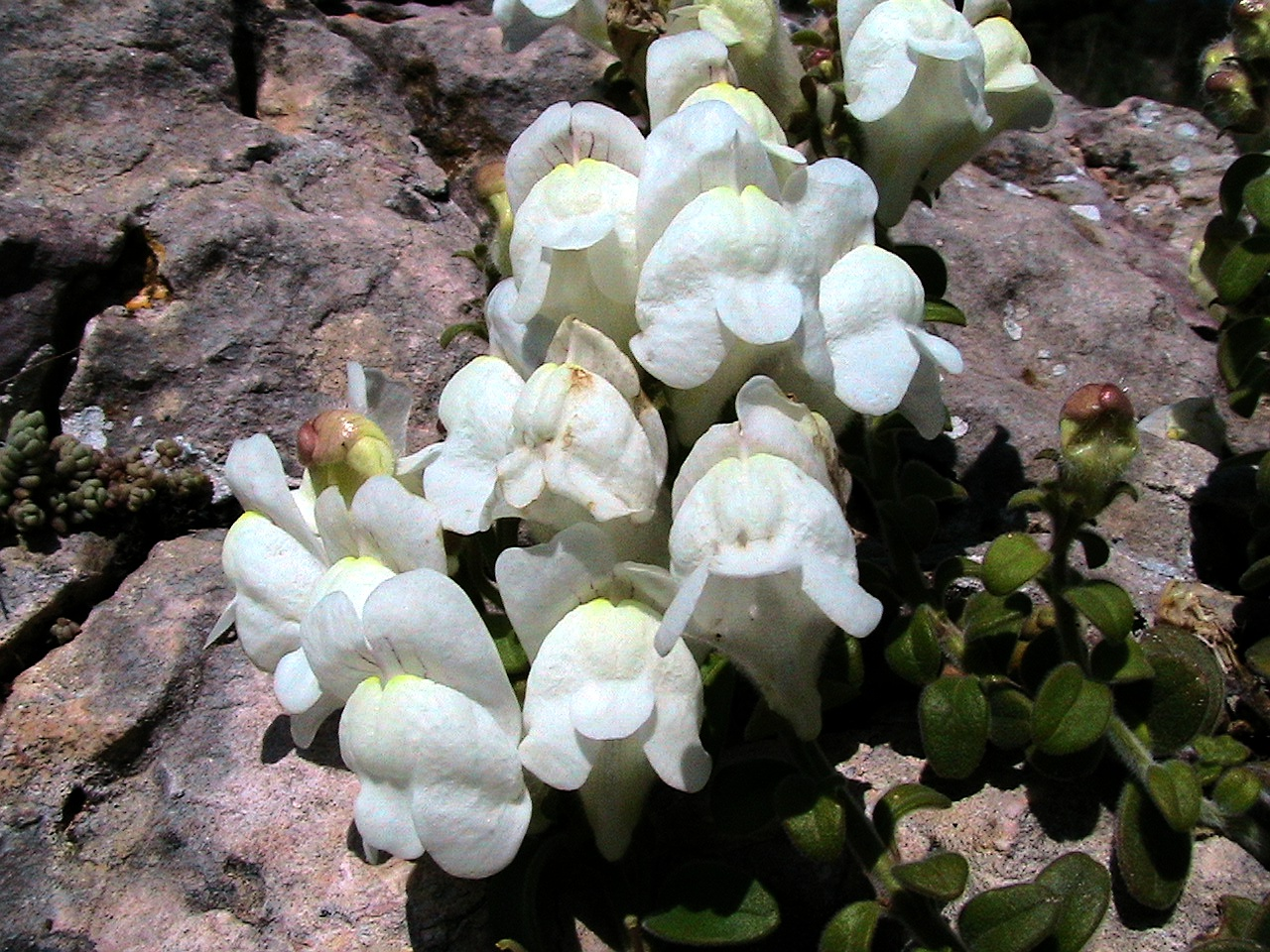
- Wild specimen in Spain
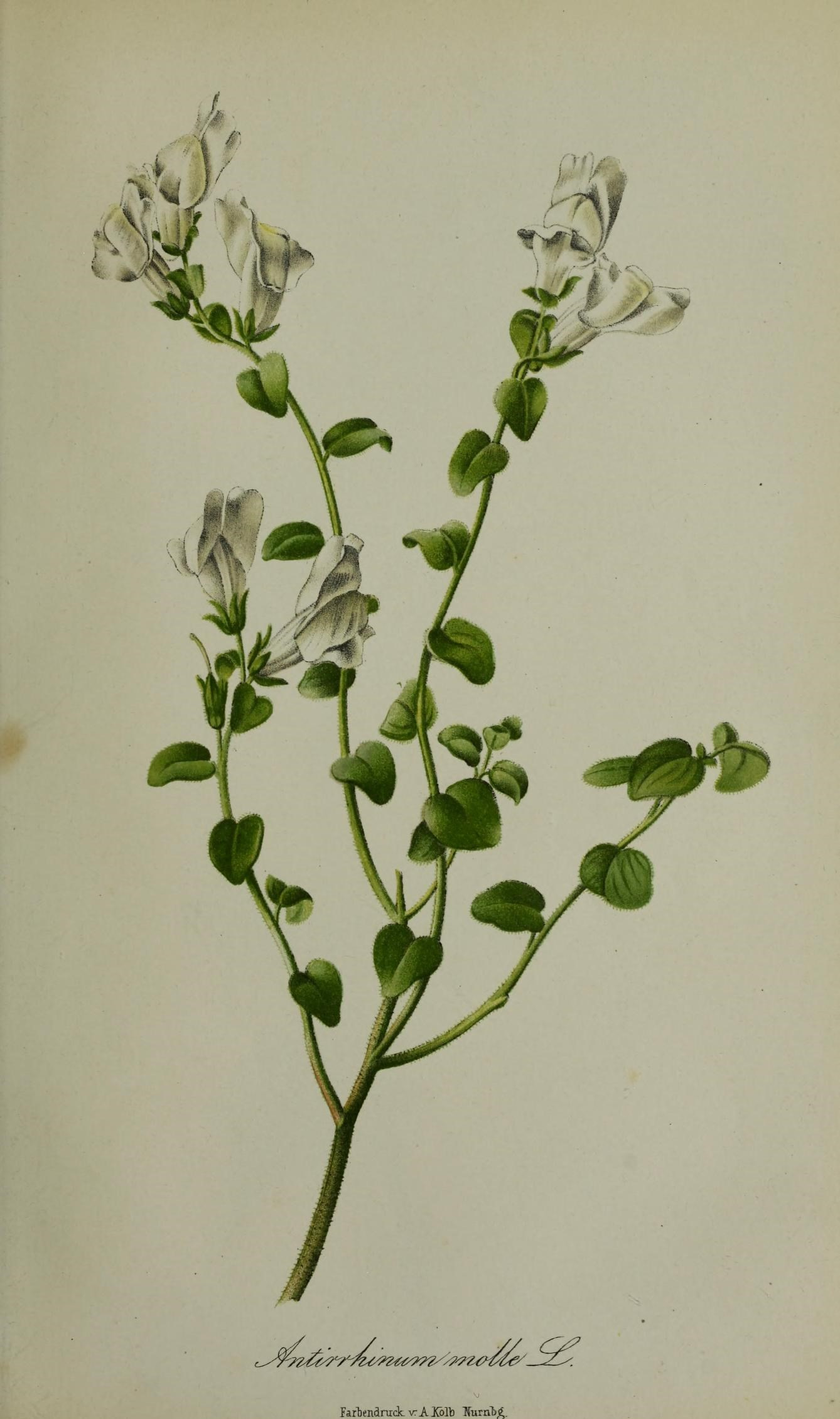
- Botanical illustration

Scientific classification
- Kingdom: Plantae
- Clade: Tracheophytes
- Clade: Angiosperms
- Clade: Eudicots
- Clade: Asterids
- Order: Lamiales
- Family: Plantaginaceae
- Genus: Antirrhinum
- Species: A. molle

Binomial name
- Antirrhinum molle L.

Synonyms
- Antirrhinum lopesianum Rothm.; Antirrhinum majus subsp. molle (L.) Malag.; Antirrhinum molle var. oppositifolium Fern.Casas; Linaria mollis (L.) Chaz.; Orontium molle (L.) Pers.

= Antirrhinum molle =

Species of plant

Antirrhinum molle, the dwarf snapdragon, is a species of flowering plant in the family Plantaginaceae. It is native to northeastern Portugal, the central and eastern Pyrenees, and adjacent areas of northern Spain. Available from commercial suppliers, it is a semi‑evergreen subshrub reaching 15 to 20 cm (6 to 8 in), with 3 cm (1.2 in) white to pale pink flowers.

== Subtaxa ==
The following subspecies are accepted:

- Antirrhinum molle subsp. lopesianum (Rothm.) P.Silva – northeastern Portugal, northwestern Spain
- Antirrhinum molle subsp. molle – Pyrenees, northeastern Spain
