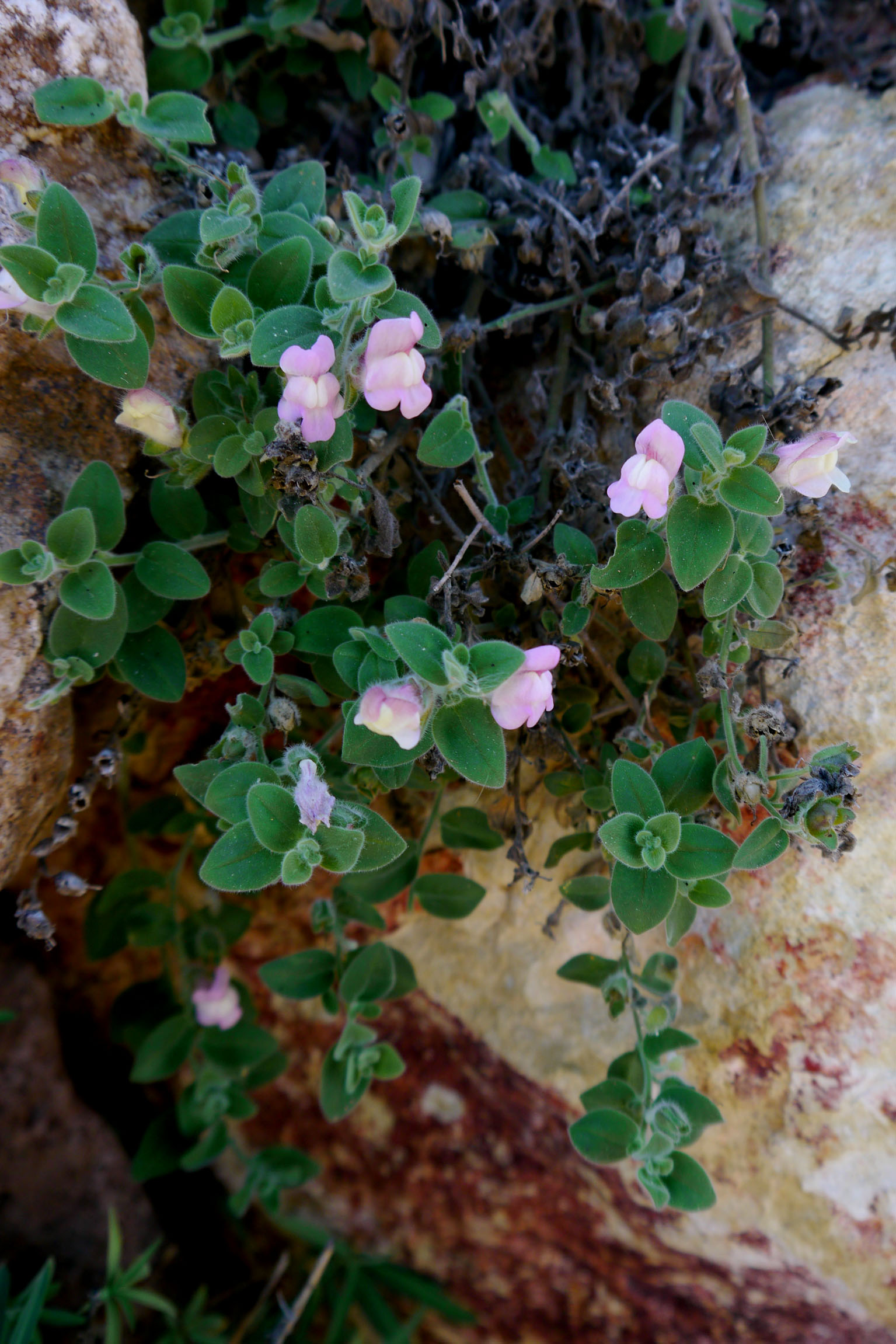
- Plant growing in Almería, Spain

Scientific classification
- Kingdom: Plantae
- Clade: Tracheophytes
- Clade: Angiosperms
- Clade: Eudicots
- Clade: Asterids
- Order: Lamiales
- Family: Plantaginaceae
- Genus: Antirrhinum
- Species: A. hispanicum

Binomial name
- Antirrhinum hispanicum Chav.

= Antirrhinum hispanicum =

Species of flowering plant

Antirrhinum hispanicum, the Spanish snapdragon, is a species of flowering plant belonging to the genus Antirrhinum that is native to southeastern Spain.

== Description ==
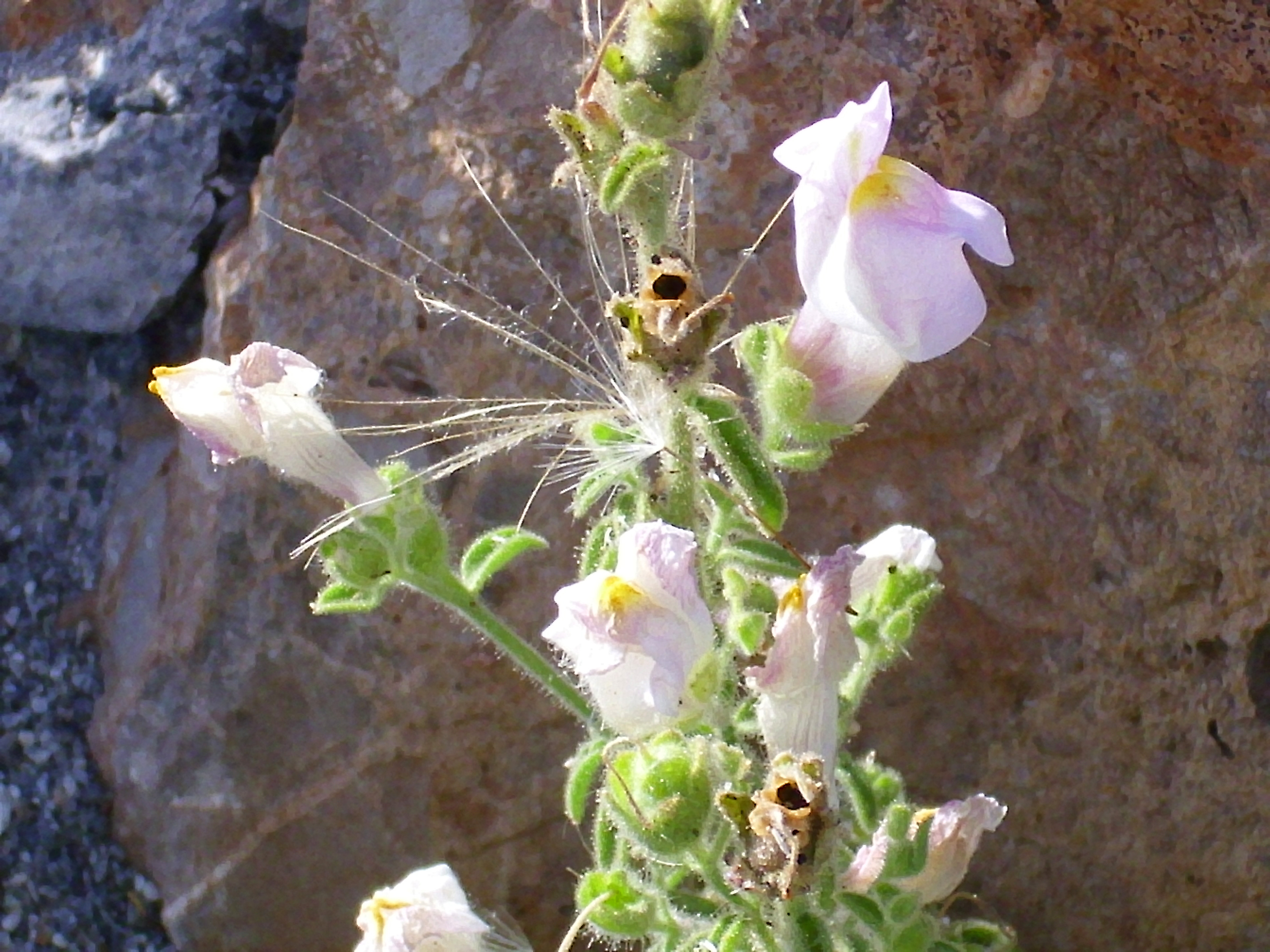
Flowers

It is a perennial herbaceous plant with short, procumbent or ascending stems. It is usually 30 or 35 centimetres (12 or 14 in) high, maximum to 60 centimetres (24 in). The plant is glandular to glandular hairy. The leaves, which are mostly opposite and mostly alternate or almost completely alternate, are 5 to 35 millimetres (0.20 to 1.38 in) long and 2 to 20 millimetres (0.079 to 0.787 in) wide, lanceolate to circular.

The flower stems are 2 to 20 millimetres (0.079 to 0.787 in) long. The calyx is set with 6 to 8 millimetres (0.24 to 0.31 in) long, egg-shaped lanceolate and almost pointed to almost blunt goblets. The crown is 20 to 25 millimetres (0.79 to 0.98 in) long, colored white or pink and occasionally has a yellow palate. Inflorescences in terminal clusters of leaf- like bracts. Flowers are hermaphrodite, zygomorphic, of calyx five-lobed almost entirely separate and corolla color white to pink or purple. Fruit in the form of a capsule that gives off ovoid seeds of black color.
