= Antigastra morysalis =

Scientific classification
- Kingdom: Animalia
- Phylum: Arthropoda
- Class: Insecta
- Order: Lepidoptera
- Family: Crambidae
- Genus: Antigastra
- Species: A. morysalis

Binomial name
- Antigastra morysalis (Walker, 1859)

Synonyms
- Botys morysalis Walker, 1859; Zebronia cranealis Walker, 1859

Species of moth

Antigastra morysalis is a moth in the family Crambidae. It was described by Francis Walker in 1859. It is found in South Africa.
