= Antigastra longipalpis =

Scientific classification
- Kingdom: Animalia
- Phylum: Arthropoda
- Class: Insecta
- Order: Lepidoptera
- Family: Crambidae
- Genus: Antigastra
- Species: A. longipalpis

Binomial name
- Antigastra longipalpis (C. Swinhoe, 1894)

Synonyms
- Lepidoneura longipalpis C. Swinhoe, 1894

Species of moth

Antigastra longipalpis is a moth in the family Crambidae. It was described by Charles Swinhoe in 1894 and is found in India.
