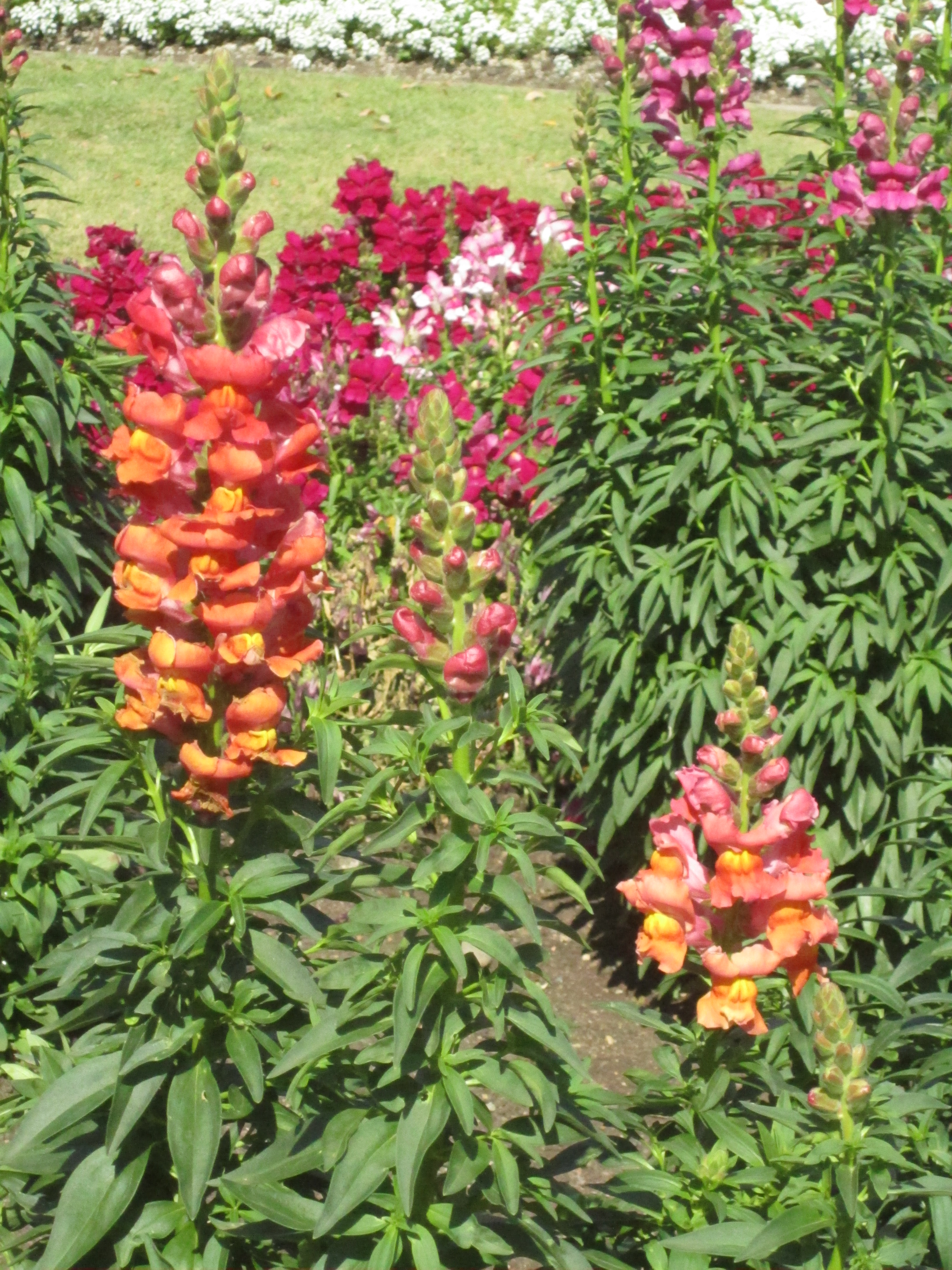
- Antirrhinum majus

Scientific classification
- Kingdom: Plantae
- Clade: Tracheophytes
- Clade: Angiosperms
- Clade: Eudicots
- Clade: Asterids
- Order: Lamiales
- Family: Plantaginaceae
- Tribe: Antirrhineae
- Genus: Antirrhinum; L.

Type species
- Antirrhinum majus L.

Sections
- Antirrhinum; Orontium; Saerorhinum

= Antirrhinum =

Antirrhinum Temporal range: 5–0 Ma Recent

Genus of plants

Antirrhinum is a genus of plants in the Plantaginaceae family, commonly known as dragon flowers or snapdragons because of the flowers' fancied resemblance to the face of a dragon that opens and closes its mouth when laterally squeezed. They are also sometimes called toadflax or dog flower. They are native to rocky areas of Europe, the United States, Canada, and North Africa. Antirrhinum species are widely used as ornamental plants in borders and as cut flowers.

== Description ==
The Antirrhinum is morphologically diverse, particularly the New World group (Saerorhinum). The genus is characterized by personate flowers with an inferior gibbous corolla.

== Taxonomy ==
Antirrhinum used to be treated within the family Scrophulariaceae, but studies of DNA sequences have led to its inclusion in a vastly enlarged family Plantaginaceae, within the tribe Antirrhineae.

=== Circumscription ===
The taxonomy of this genus is complex and not yet fully resolved at present. In particular the exact circumscription of the genus, especially the inclusion of the New World species (Saerorhinum), is contentious. The situation is further complicated by the variety of terms in use for infrageneric ranks, especially of the Old World species, that is Antirrhinum, sensu stricto (e.g. Streptosepalum, Kicksiella, Meonantha).

The USDA Plants Database recognises only two species: Antirrhinum majus (the garden snapdragon), the only species naturalised in North America, and A. bellidifolium (the lilac snapdragon), now considered to be Anarrhinum bellidifolium (L.) Willd. There are 23 accepted species.

A widely accepted scheme (Thompson 1988) placed 36 species in the genus in three sections. While many botanists accepted this broad circumscription (sensu lato), whose main departure from other classifications was the inclusion of the New World Saerorhinum, others did not, restricting the genus to the Old World. (For a comparison of Thompson with earlier systems, see Oyama and Baum, Table 1.) New species also continue to be discovered (see e.g. Romo et al., 1995).

In 2004, research into the molecular systematics of this group and related species by Oyama and Baum confirmed that the genus sensu lato as described by Thompson is monophyletic, provided that one species (A. cyathiferum) is removed to the separate genus Pseudorontium, and the two species of Mohavea (Mohavea confertiflora and M. breviflora) are included. The species list given here follows these conclusions.

This is the broad circumscription that includes the Old World Misopates and New World Sairocarpus. By contrast the narrow circumscription (sensu stricto) confines the genus to the monophyletic Old World perennial species with a diploid chromosome number of 16, distributed in the Mediterranean basin, approximately 25 species, following the phylogenetic analysis of Vargas et al. (2004) suggesting they are a distinct group. Both Misopates and Sairocarpus are accepted names in The Plant List, and many of the New World species now have Sairocarpus as their accepted name, rather than Antirrhinum. It has been proposed that many of the New World Antirrhinum be now considered under Sairocarpus, in the forthcoming Flora of North America.

=== Infrageneric subdivision ===
It is widely agreed that this broad group should be subdivided into three or four subgroups, but the level at which this should be done, and exactly which species should be grouped together, remain unclear. Some authors continue to follow Thompson in using a large genus Antirrhinum, which is then divided into several sections; others treat Thompson's genus as a tribe or subtribe, and divide it into several genera. For a comparison of earlier schemes see Mateu-Andrés and de Paco, Table 1 (2005)

If the broad circumscription is accepted, its three sections as described by Thompson are as follows (two Old World, one New):

- Section Antirrhinum: 19 Old World species of relatively large flowered perennial plants, including the type species Antirrhinum majus, mostly native to the western Mediterranean region with a focus on the Iberian Peninsula. Chromosomes number=8. (3 subsections: Majora, Sicula, Hispanica)
- Section Orontium: two species, also from the Mediterranean. Chromosome n=8. The species in this section, including the section type species Antirrhinum orontium (lesser snapdragon) are often treated in the genus Misopates.
- Section Saerorhinum: 15 small flowered New World species, mostly annual plants and mostly native to California, though species are found from Oregon to Baja California Sur and as far east as Utah. Tetraploid (n=15-16). Like other authors, Thompson placed A. cyathiferum in this section, but Oyama and Baum, following earlier authors, suggest that it should be reclassified in genus Pseudorontium, while Mohavea should be included. Vargas et al., strongly recommending segregation of the New World species suggest that the 14 species originally recognised by Sutton (1988) more properly belong to Sairocarpus (11 species), Howelliella (1 species), and Neogarrhinum (2 species). Other authors would also include Galvezia glabrata, Galvezia juncea, Galvezia rupicola and Galvezia speciosa. None of the names originally allocated to this section are now accepted.

=== Snapdragons ===
While Antirrhinum majus is the plant that is usually meant by the term of "snapdragon" if used on its own, many other species in the genus, and in the family Scrophulariaceae more widely, have common names that include the word "snapdragon". For example, Antirrhinum molle is known as "dwarf snapdragon" in the UK.

=== Species ===
The following species are recognised in the genus Antirrhinum:

- Antirrhinum australe Rothm.
- Antirrhinum barrelieri Boreau
- Antirrhinum × bilbilitanum Güemes & Mateo
- Antirrhinum braun-blanquetii Rothm.
- Antirrhinum charidemi Lange
- Antirrhinum × chavannesii Rothm.
- Antirrhinum cirrhigerum (Welw. ex Ficalho) Rothm.
- Antirrhinum controversum Pau
- Antirrhinum × ferrandopardoi P.P.Ferrer
- Antirrhinum graniticum Rothm.
- Antirrhinum grosii Font Quer
- Antirrhinum hispanicum Chav.
- Antirrhinum × inexpectans P.P.Ferrer, R.Roselló, E.Laguna & Güemes
- Antirrhinum × kretschmeri Rothm.
- Antirrhinum latifolium Mill.
- Antirrhinum linkianum Boiss. & Reut.
- Antirrhinum majus L.
- Antirrhinum martenii (Font Quer) Rothm.
- Antirrhinum meonanthum Hoffmanns. & Link
- Antirrhinum microphyllum Rothm.
- Antirrhinum molle L.
- Antirrhinum × montserratii Molero & Romo
- Antirrhinum pertegasii Rothm.
- Antirrhinum pulverulentum Lázaro Ibiza
- Antirrhinum rothmaleri (P.Silva) Amich, Bernardos & García-Barriuso
- Antirrhinum sempervirens Lapeyr.
- Antirrhinum siculum Mill.
- Antirrhinum tortuosum Bosc ex Lam.
- Antirrhinum valentinum Font Quer

=== Etymology ===
The name "Antirrhinum" is derived from the Greek ἀντίρρινον antirrhinon which in turn is derived from ἀντί anti "opposite, counterfeiting", and ῥίς rhis "nose" (GEN ῥινόϛ rhinos); from its resemblance to an animal's mouth.

== Ecology ==
Snapdragons are short-lived perennial plants that survive well in cold seasons but are often replanted each spring and considered annual plants. They do best in full or partial sun, in well-drained soil since their roots are susceptible to rotting (although they do require regular watering). They are classified commercially as a range of heights: midget or dwarf (15–20 cm or 6–8 in), medium (40–75 cm or 15–30 in) and tall (75–120 cm or 30–48 in). Removing the dead flowers, referred to as deadheading, is important to help them to continuously produce beautiful flowers throughout their growing season. They are susceptible to ethylene gas, so removing dead flowers and keeping them away from ripe fruits or vegetables also helps them bloom longer. They grow during their peak seasons of April to June and August to October in the Northern Hemisphere and bloom in a variety of colors such as white, yellow, orange, red, purple, pink, including multicolored patterns.

They are ecologically diverse, particularly the New World species (Saerorhinum).

== Cultivation ==
The snapdragon is an important garden plant, widely cultivated from tropical to temperate zones as a bedding, rockery, herbaceous border or container plant. Cultivars have showy white, crimson, or yellow bilabiate flowers (with two lips). It is also important as a model organism in botanical research, and its genome has been studied in detail.

=== Genetic studies ===
Antirrhinum is a genus that has been used from the earliest genetic studies of Gregor Mendel and Charles Darwin and was used as a model by Erwin Baur. Together with closely related genera, it has become a model organism for the investigation of the genetic basis of plant development, particularly floral development. The genus is a typical example of incomplete dominance by the red allele with the anthocyanin pigment. Any cross between red-flowered and white-flowered snapdragons, give an intermediate and heterozygous phenotype with pink flowers, that carries both the dominant and recessive alleles.

Several species of Antirrhinum are self-incompatible, meaning that a plant cannot be fertilised by its own pollen. Self-incompatibility in the genus has been studied since the early 1900s. Self-incompatibility in Antirrhinum species is controlled gametophytically and shares many important features with self-incompatibility systems in Rosaceae and Solanaceae.

== Uses ==
In addition to growing the plants for cut flowers, the seeds have been used to extract edible oils, particularly in Russia, while the leaves and flowers have been considered to possess antiphlogistic (anti-inflammatory) properties and have been used in poultices. A green dye has also been extracted from the flowers.

== Gallery ==
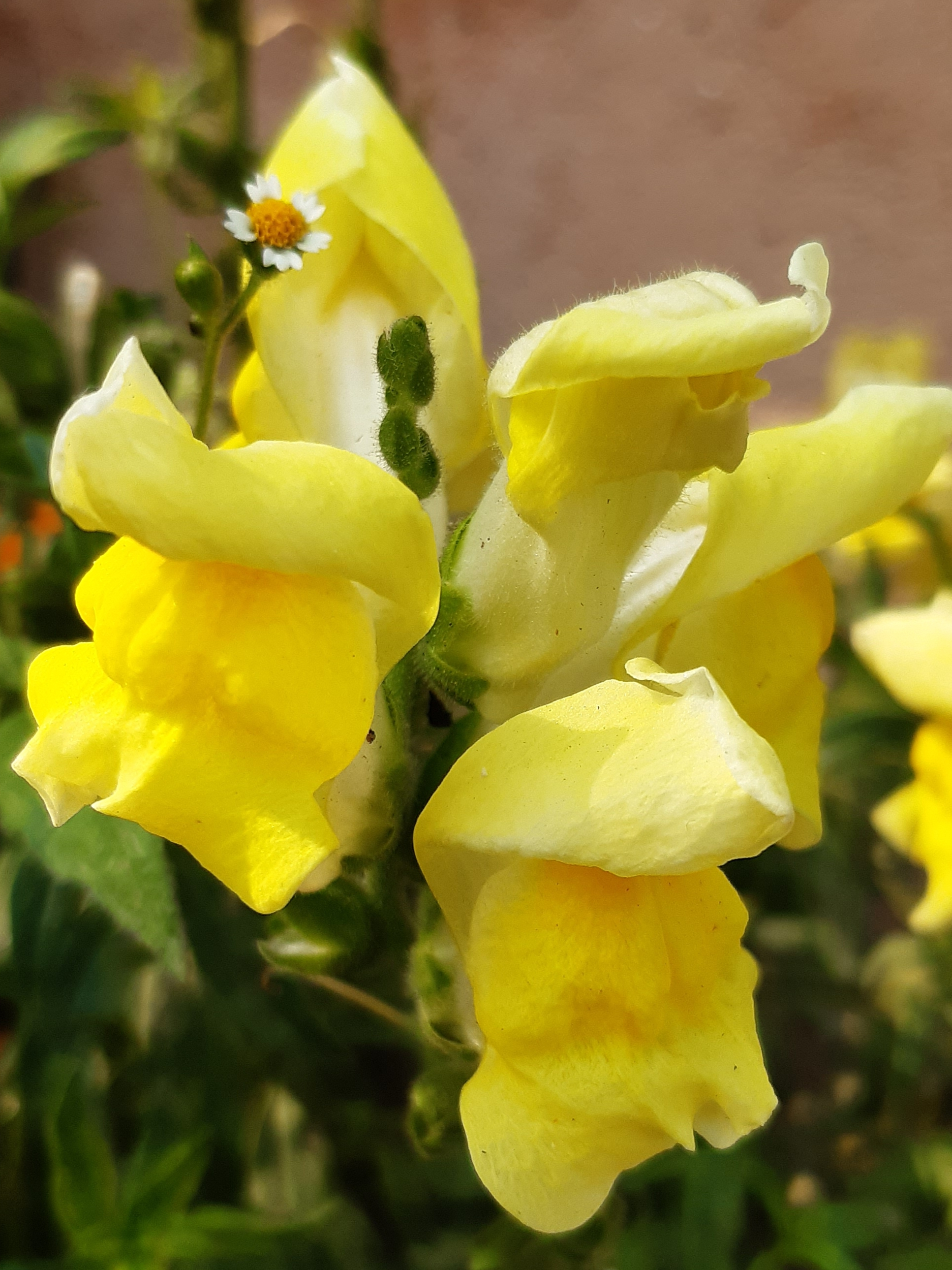
Yellow snapdragon flower

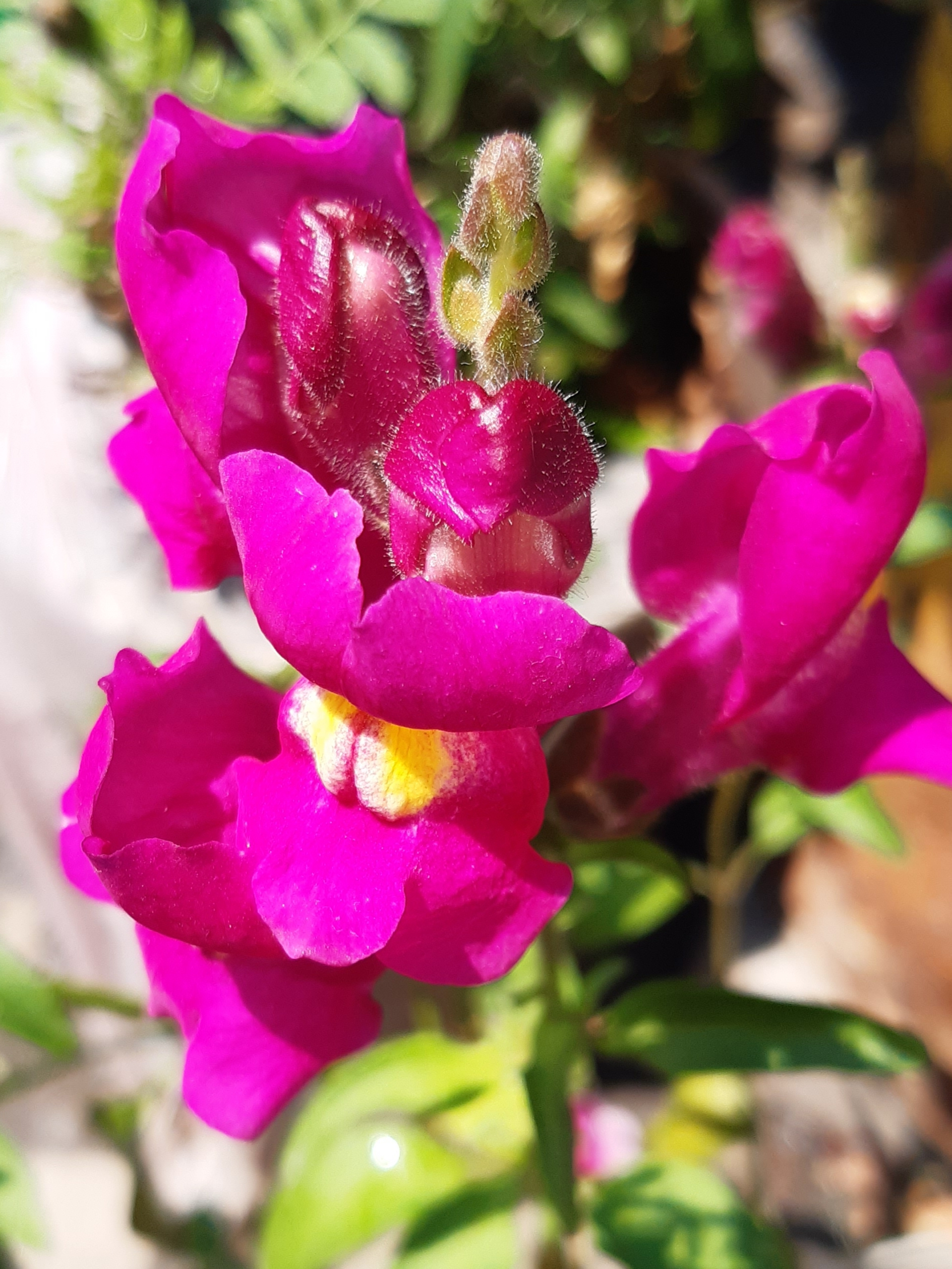
Antirrhinum majus flower

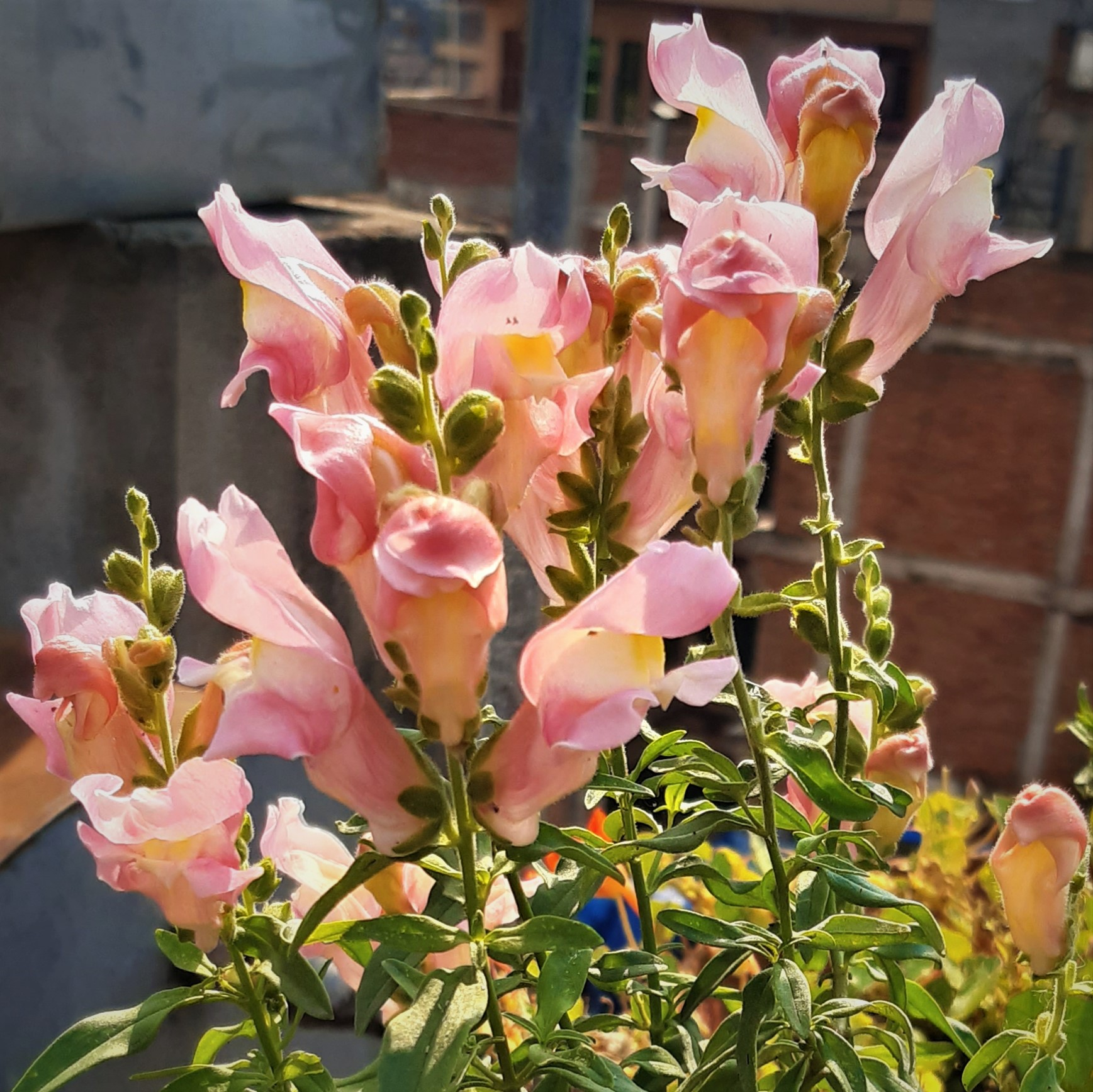
Pink snapdragon flower

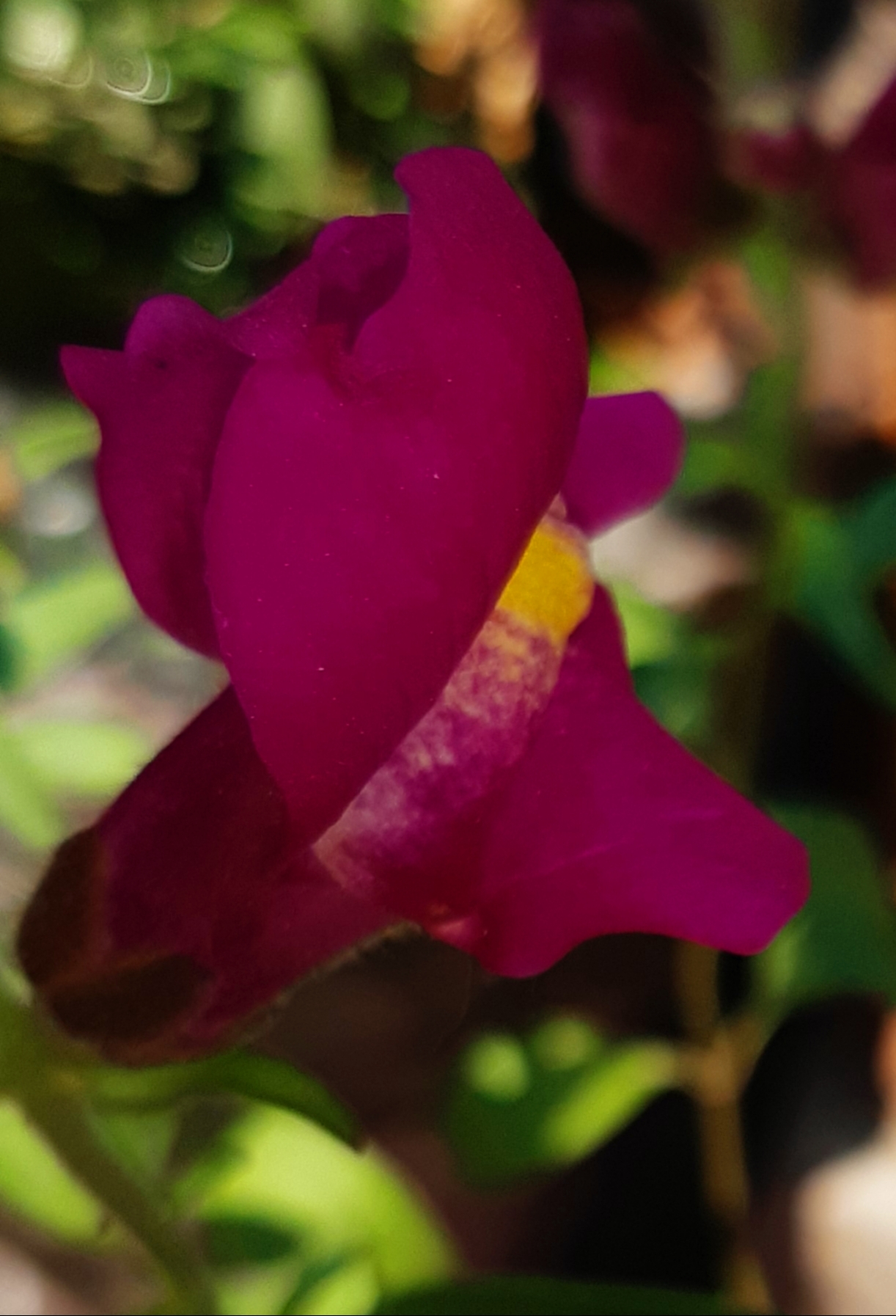
Antirrhinum majus flower

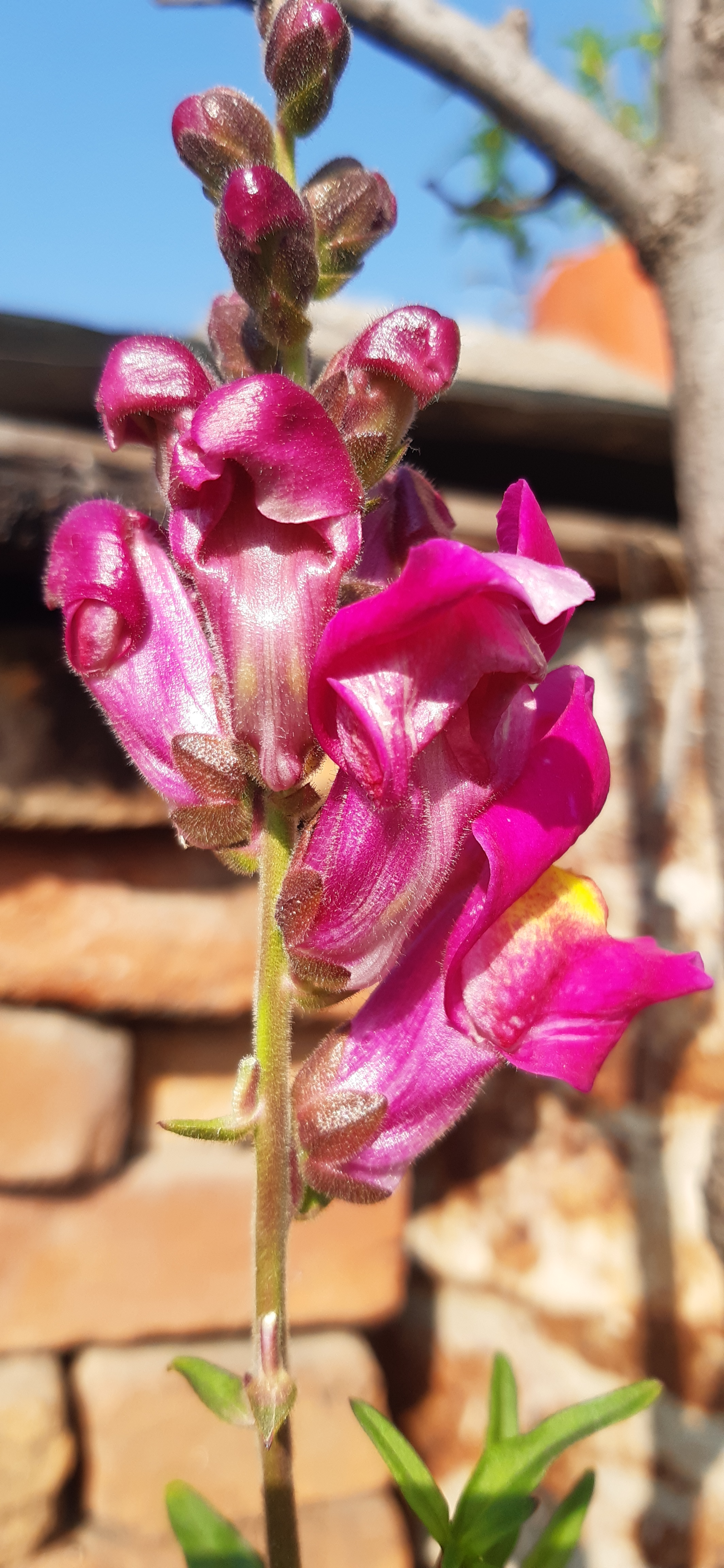
Pink snapdragon flower

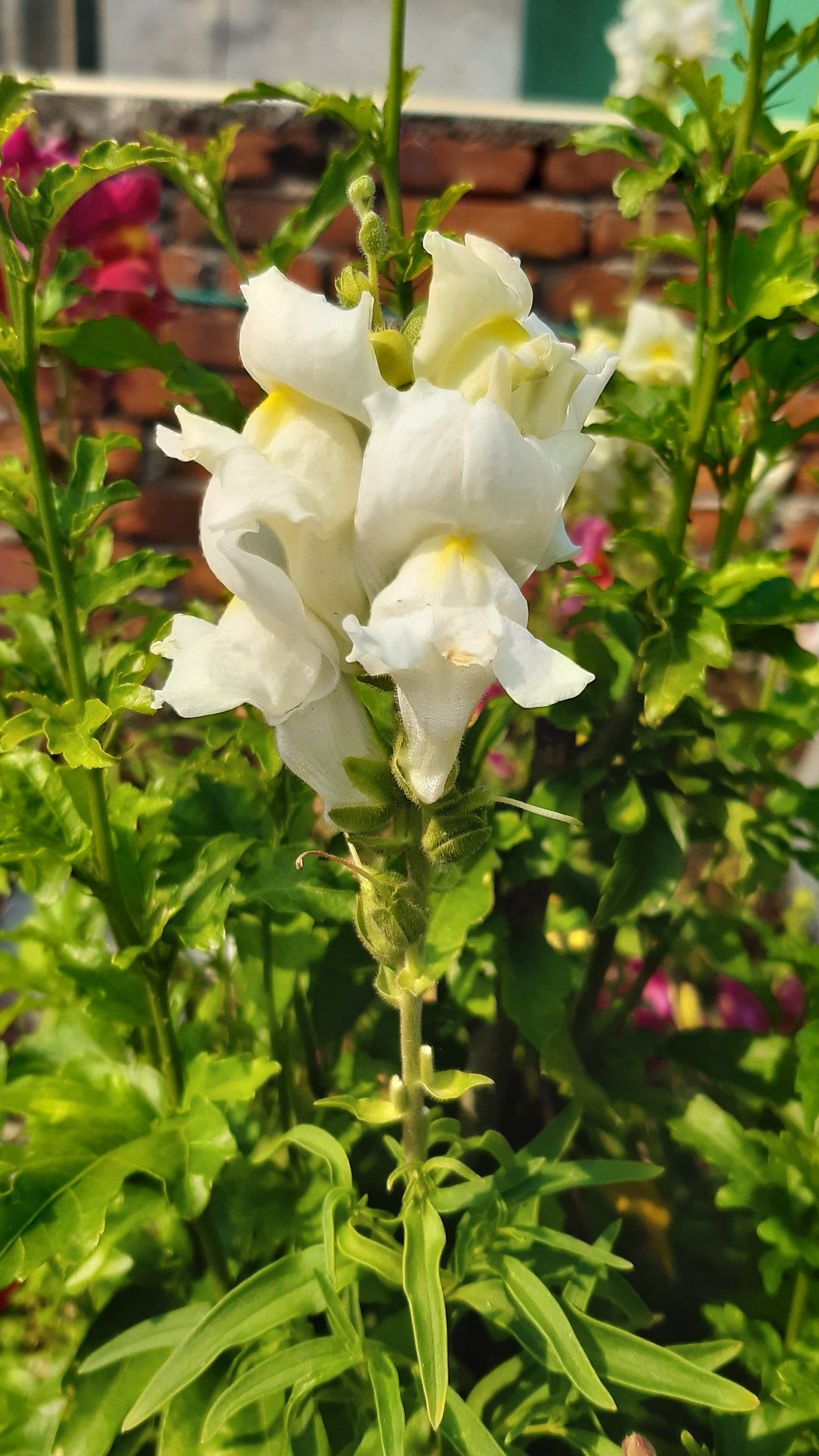
White snapdragon flower

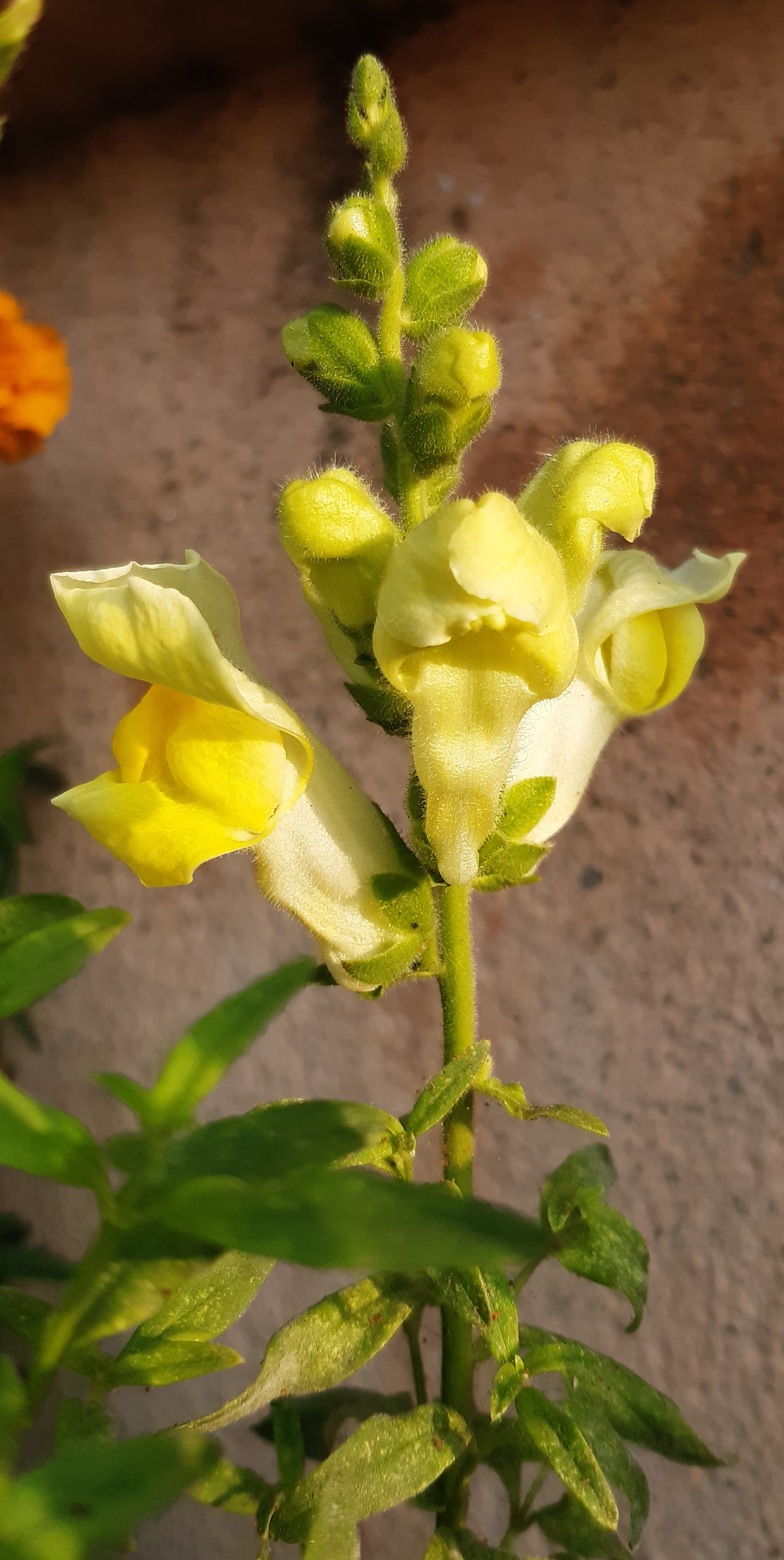
Yellow snapdragon flower

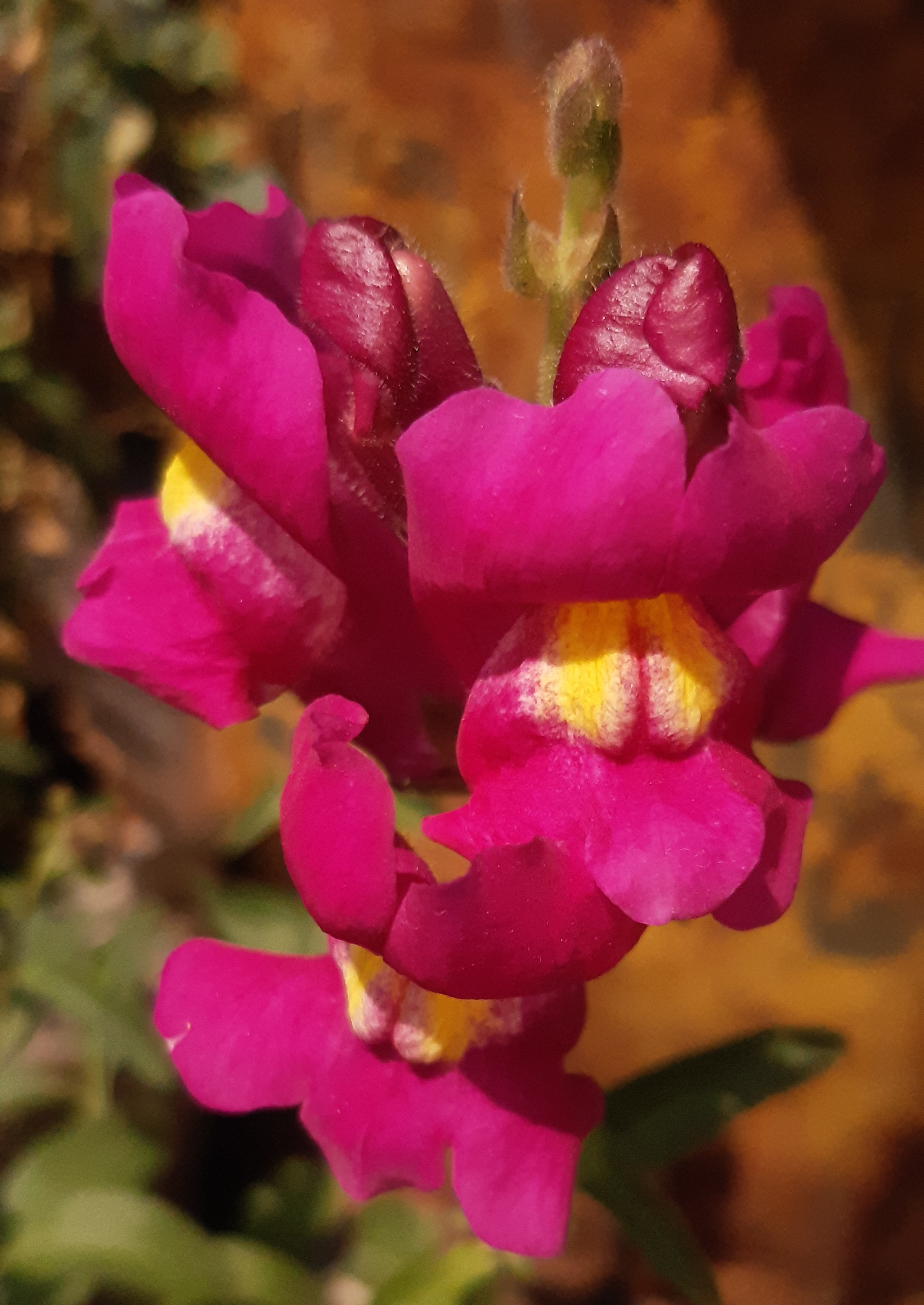
Antirrhinum majus flower

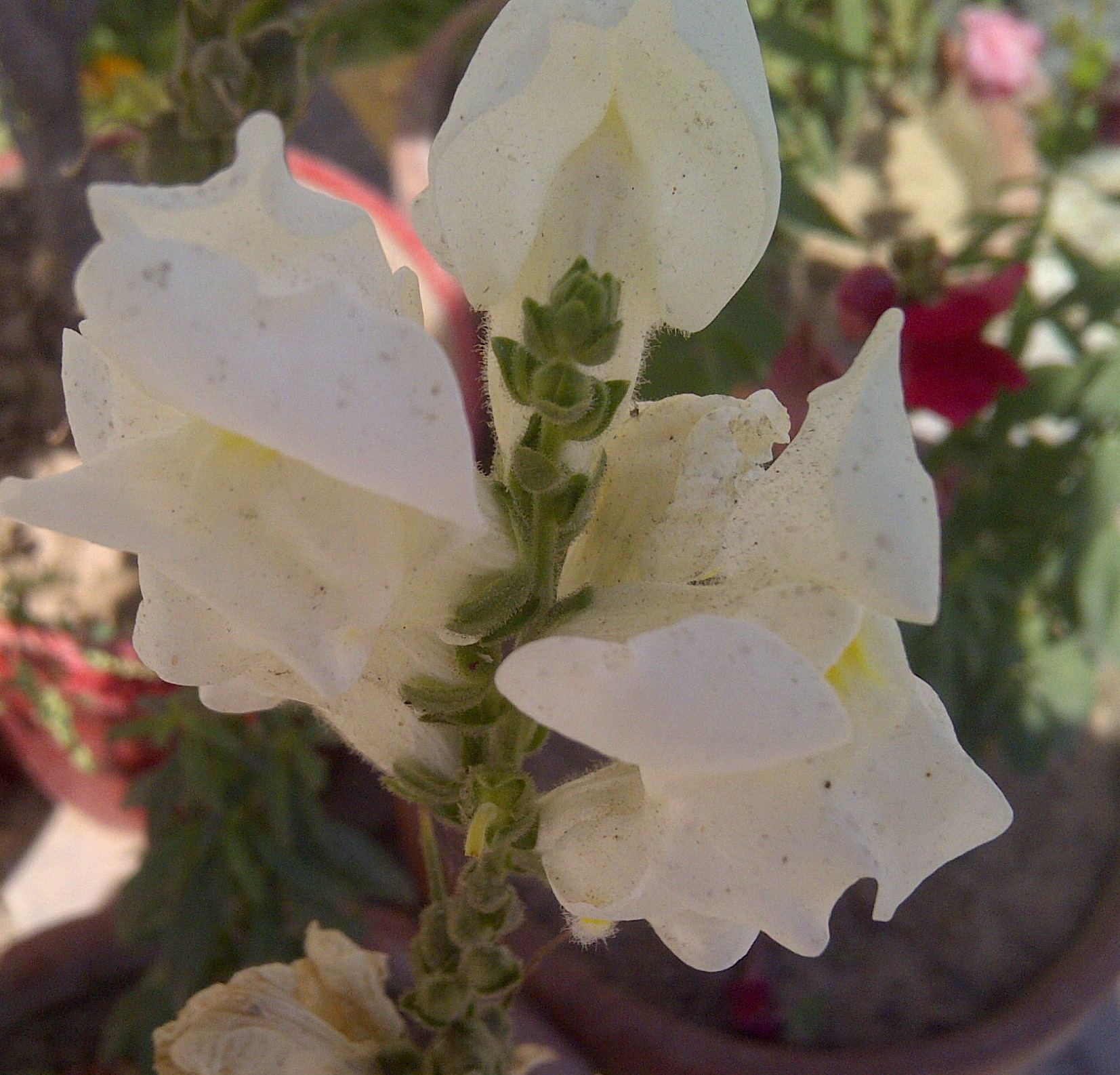
Variety in Pakistan

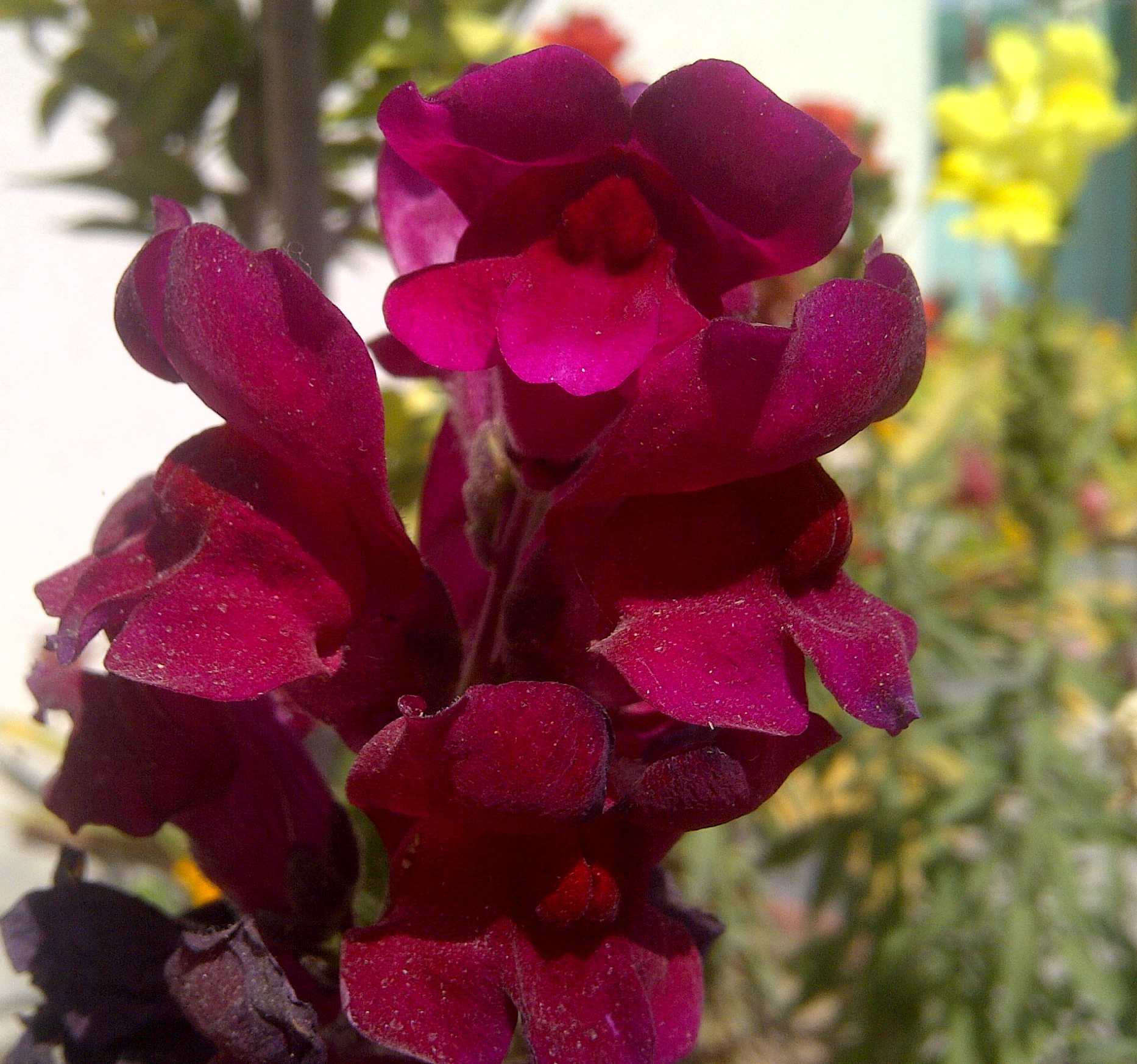
Variety in Pakistan

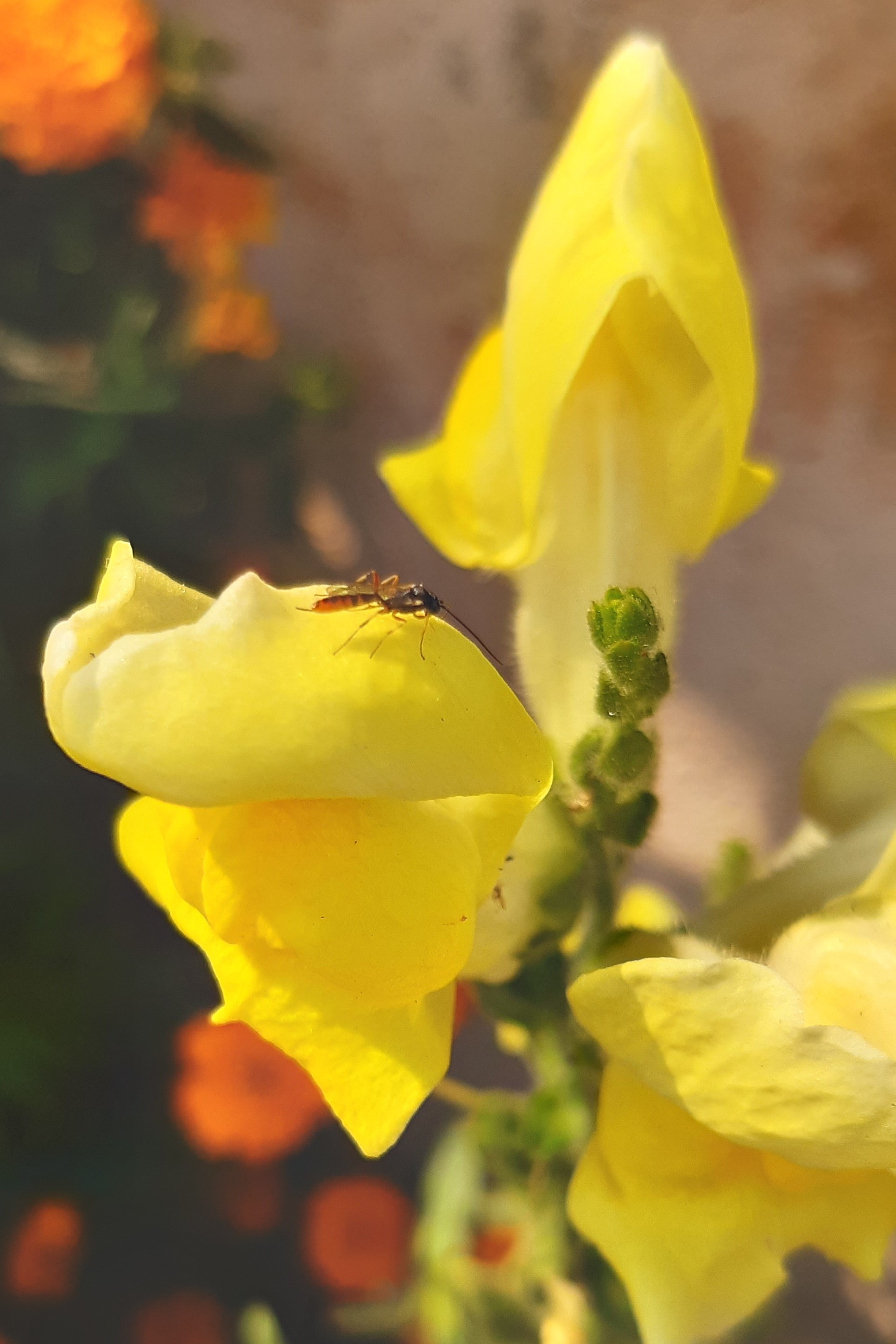
Yellow snapdragon flower

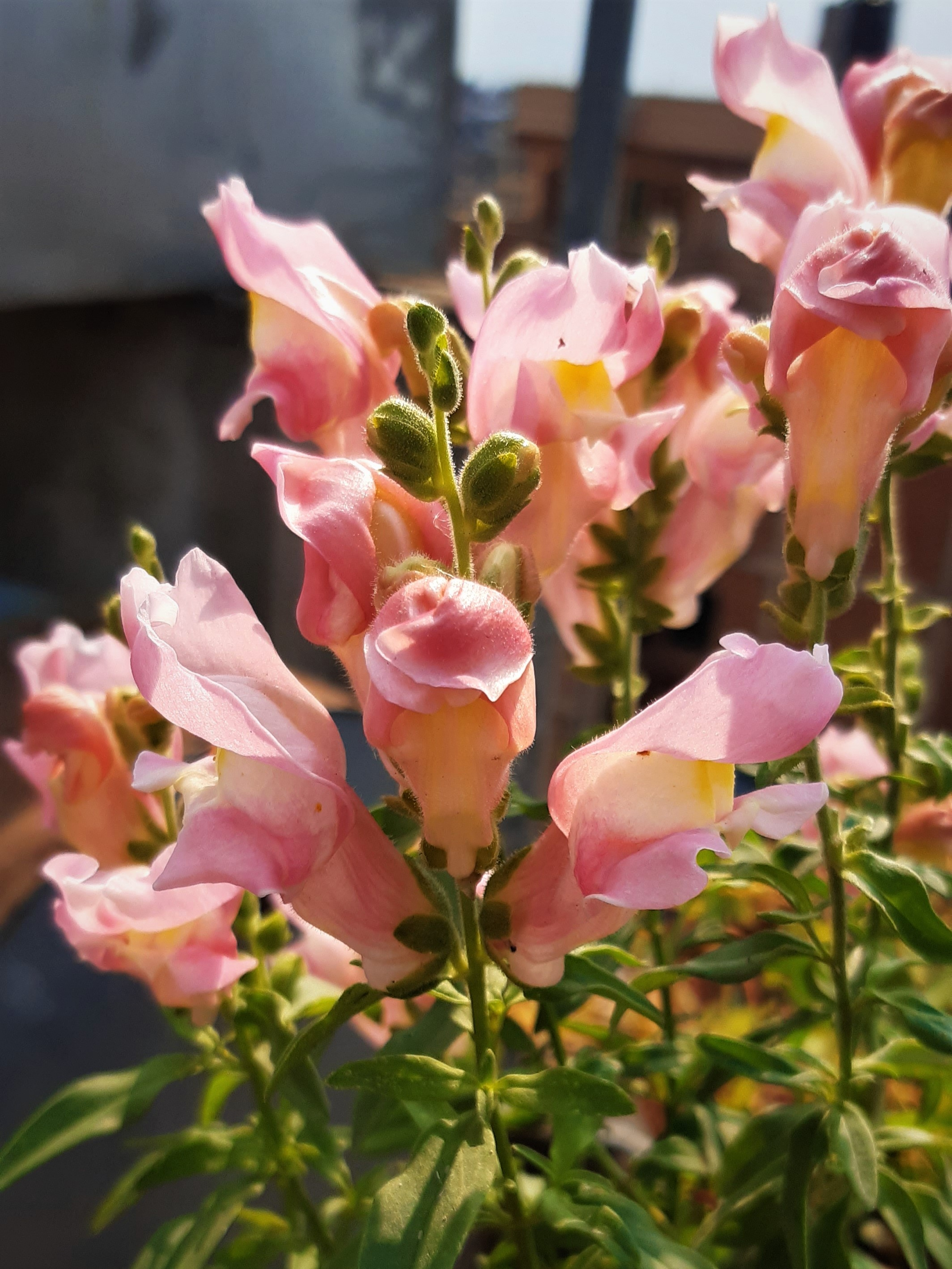
Pink snapdragon flower

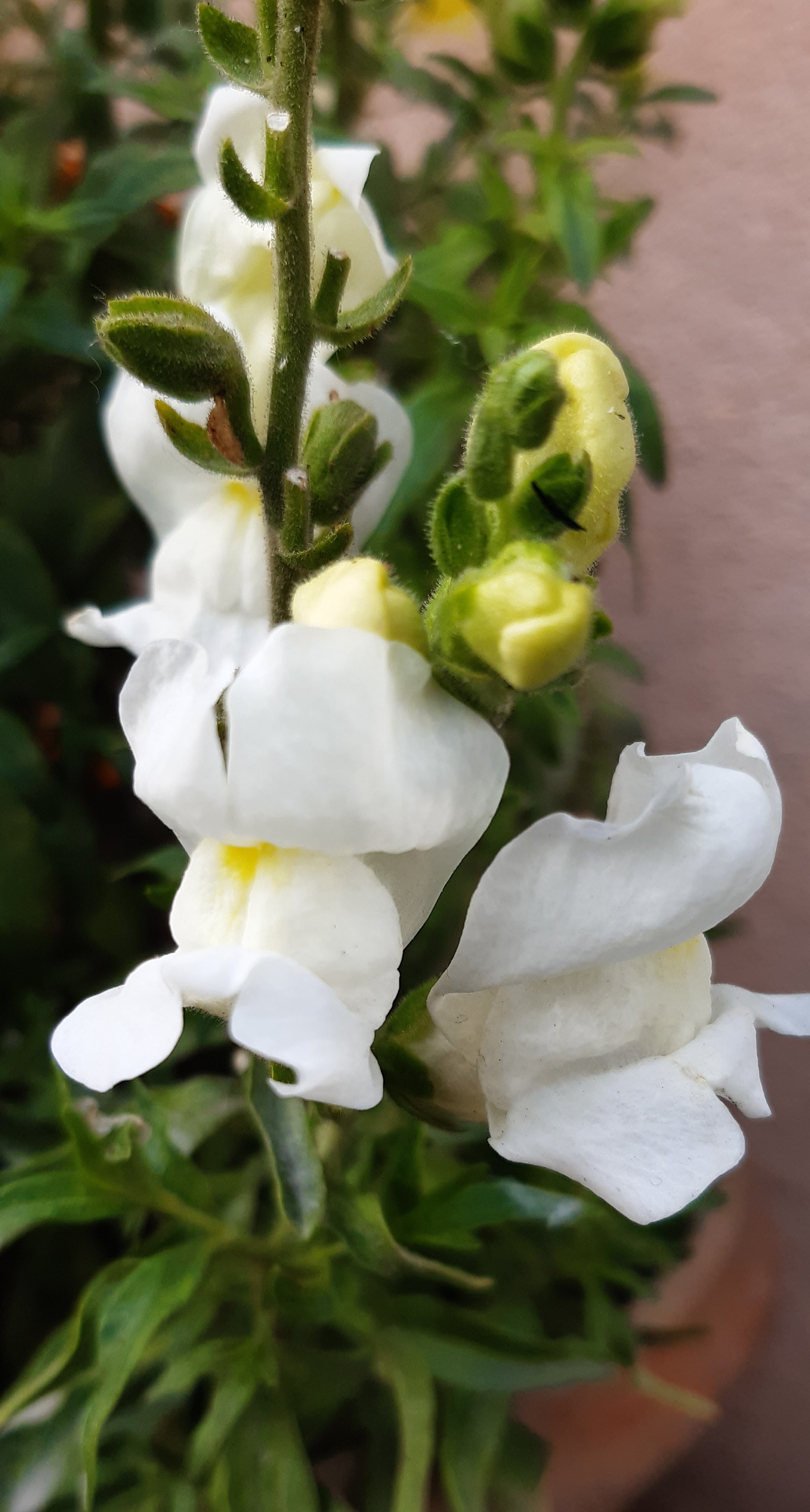
White snapdragon flower

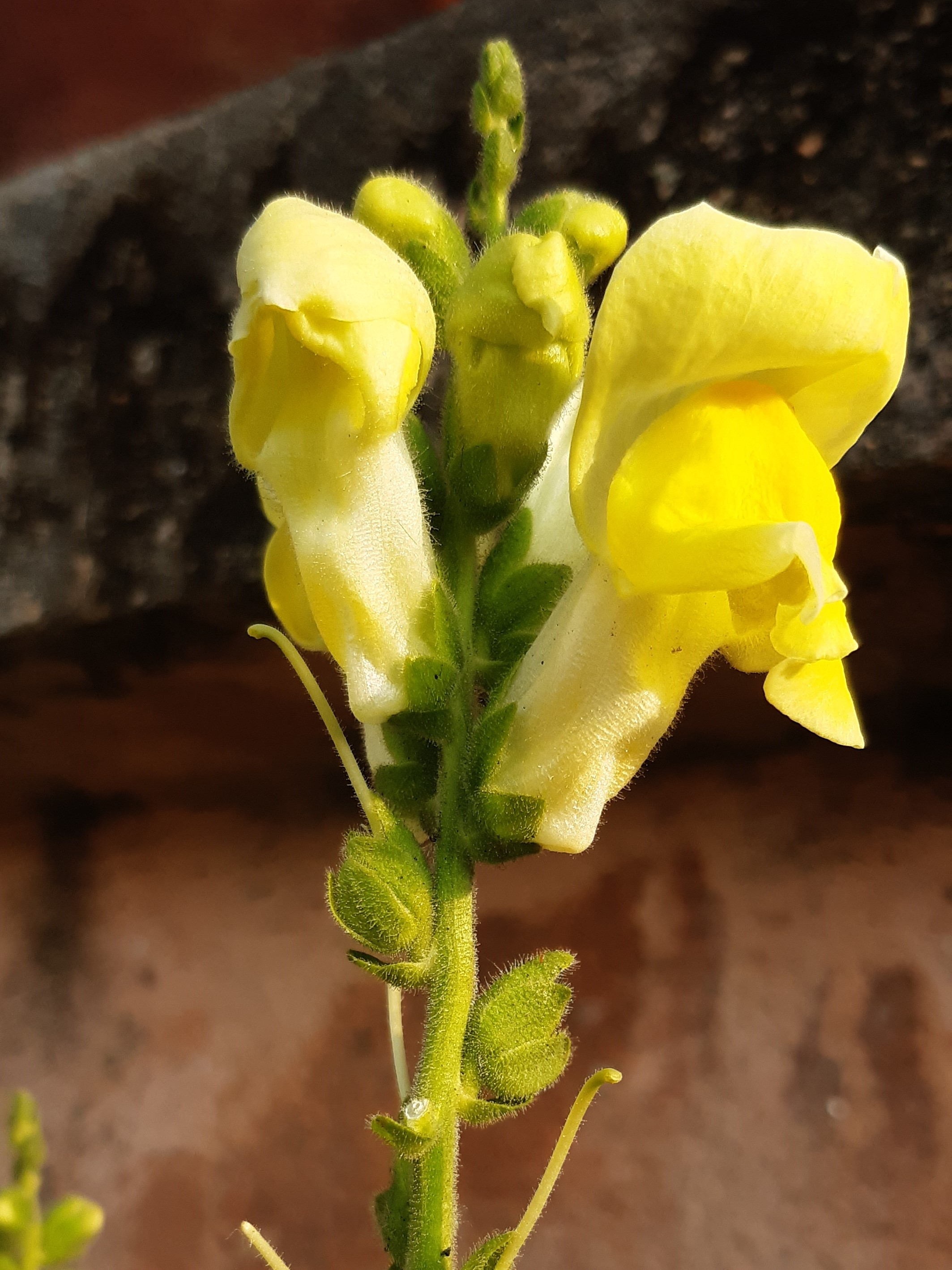
Yellow snapdragon flower

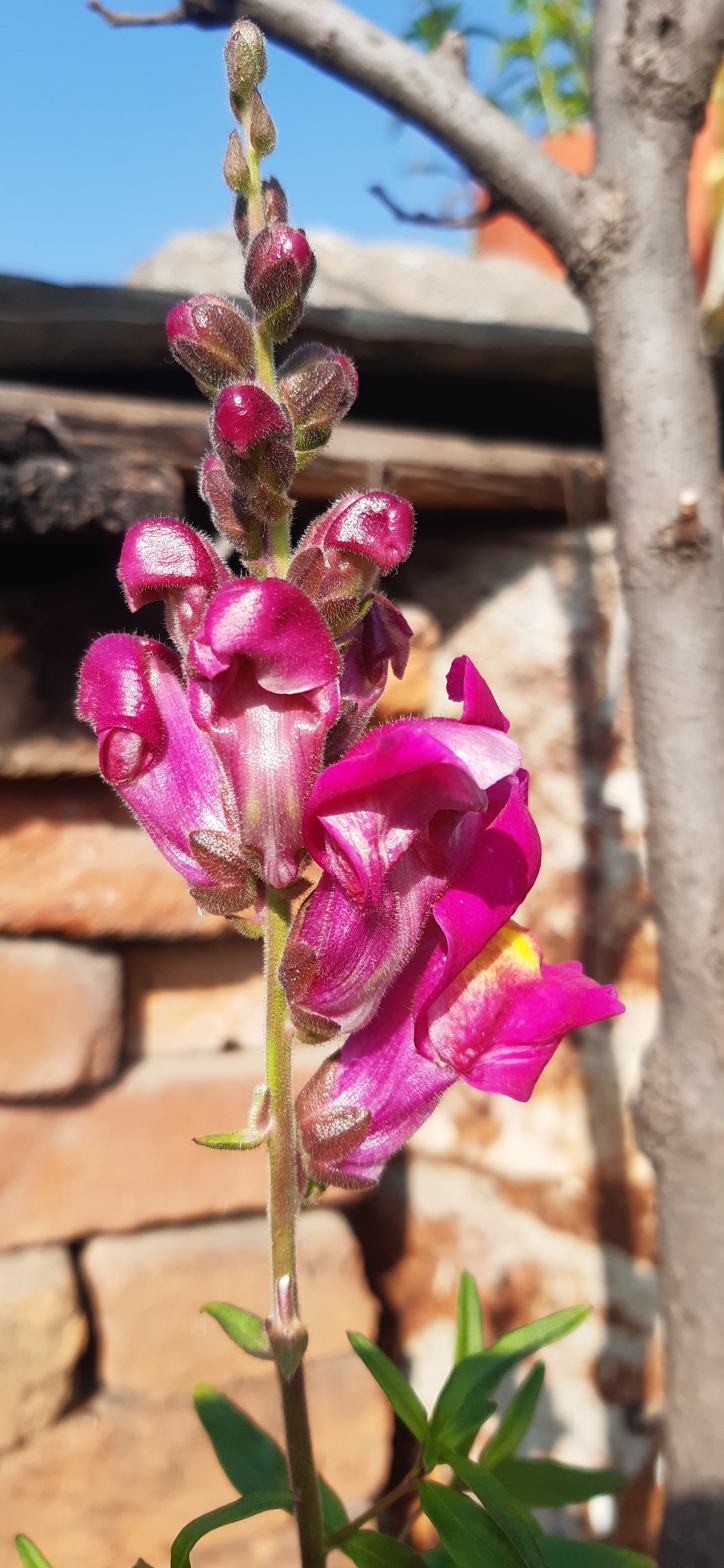
Pink snapdragon flower

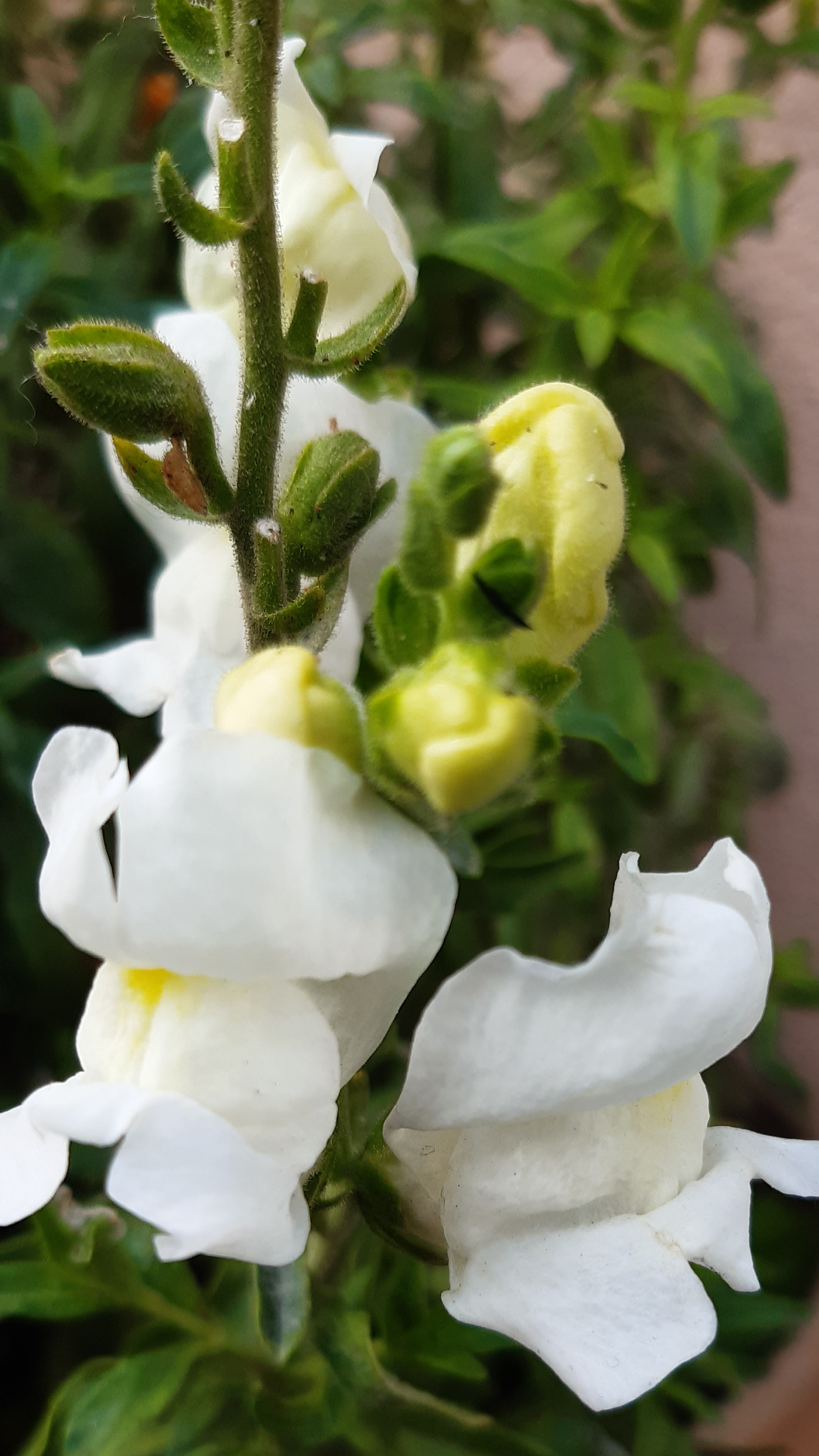
White snapdragon flower

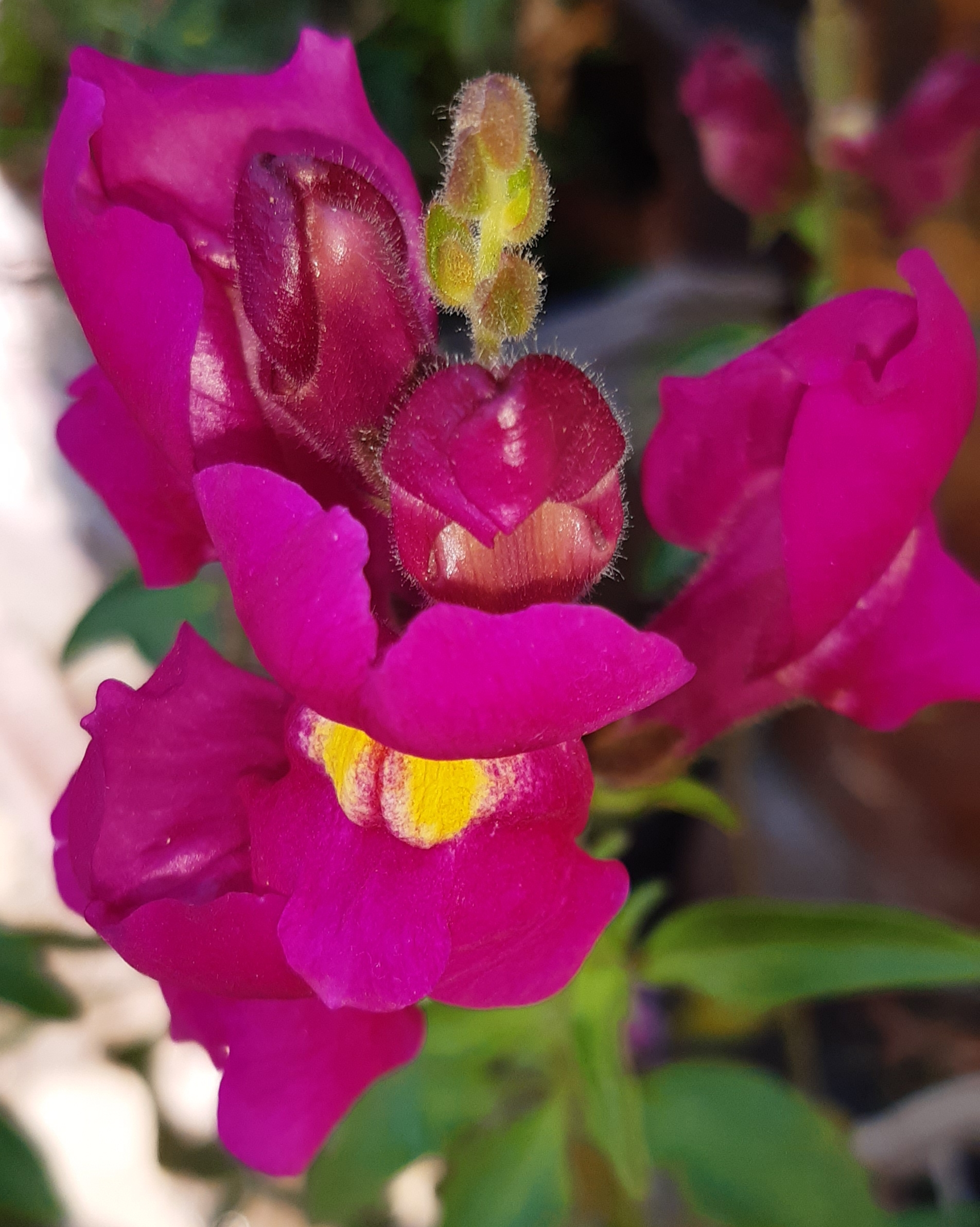
Antirrhinum majus flower

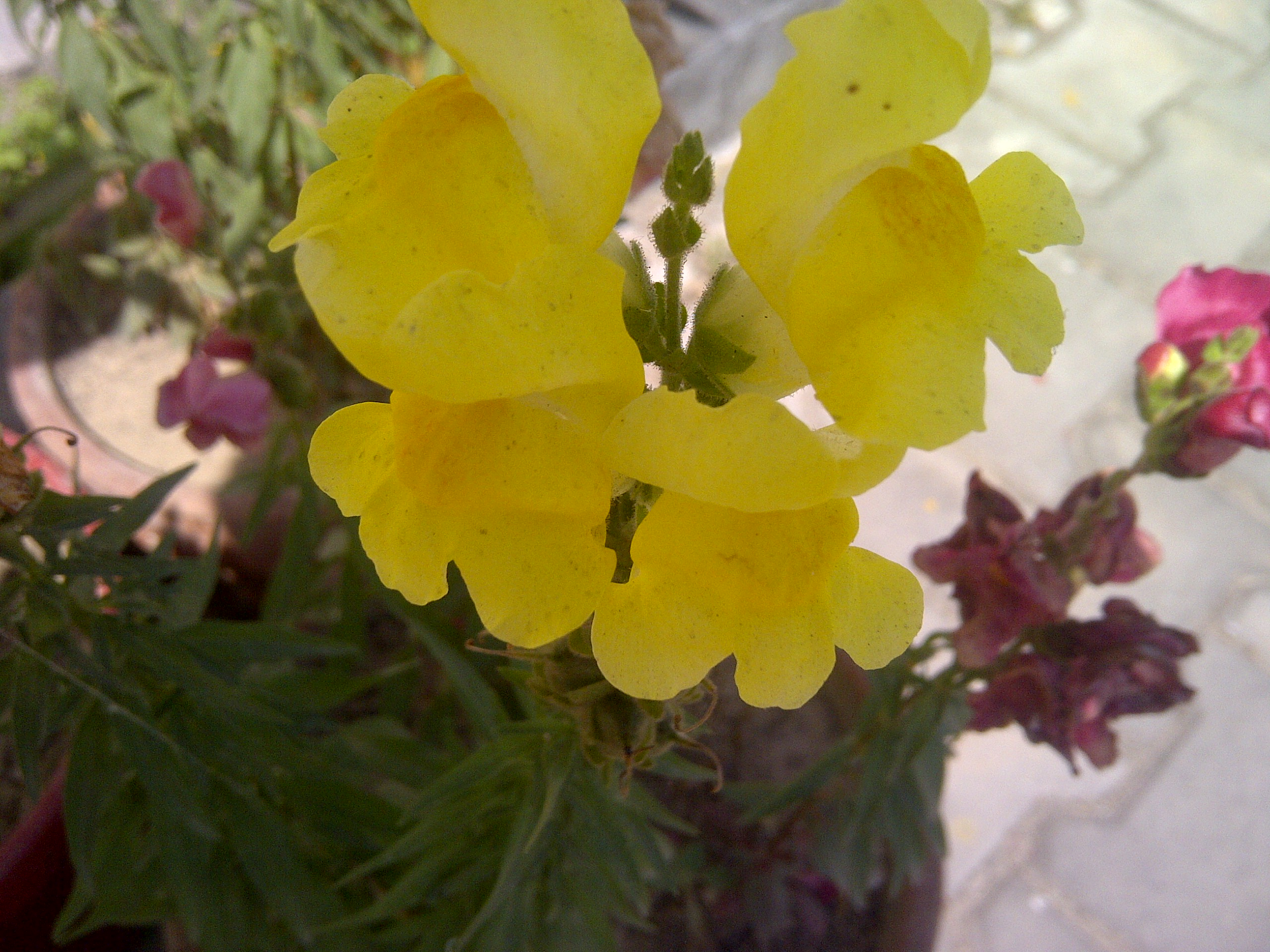
Variety in Pakistan

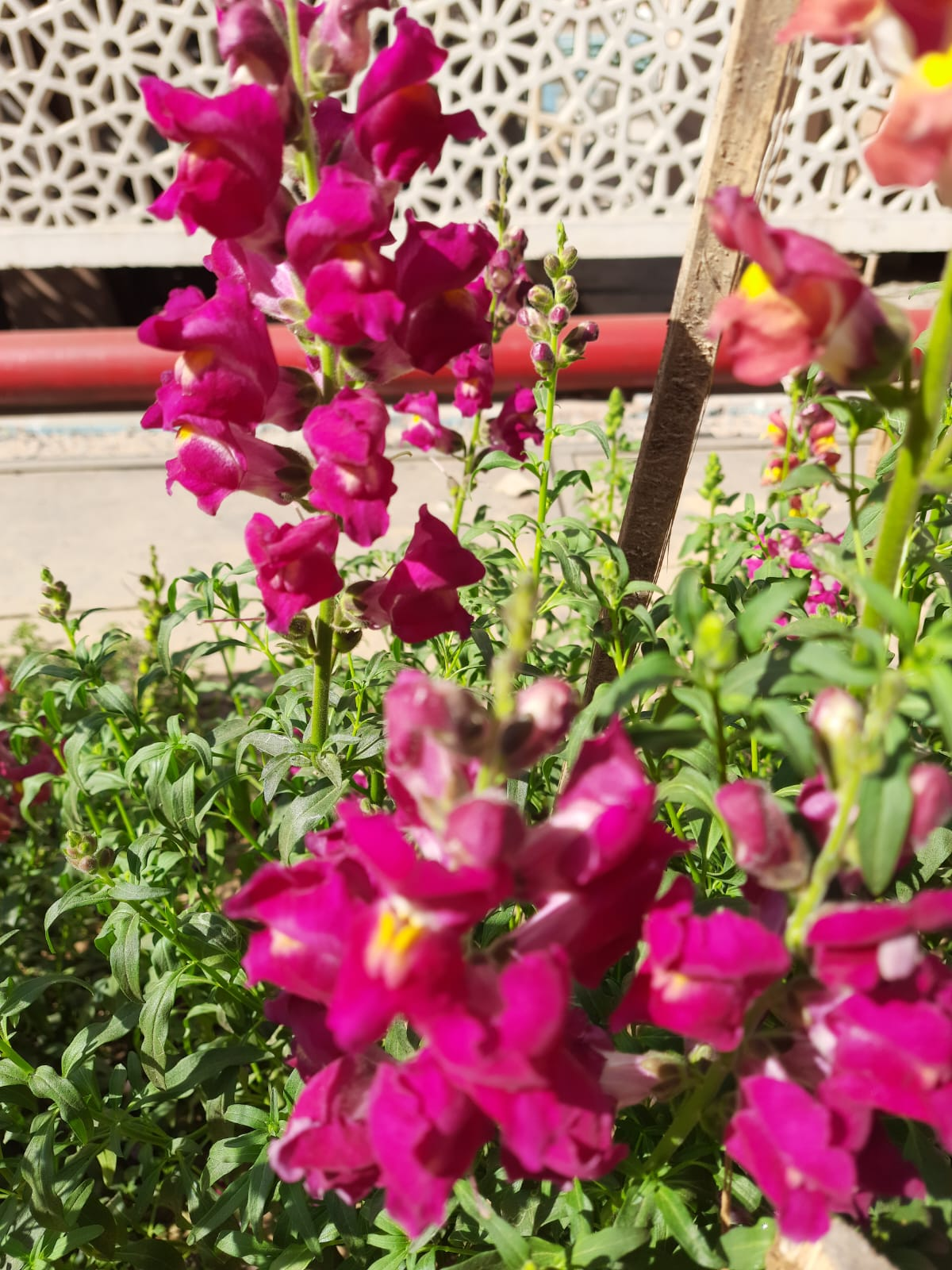
Variety in India

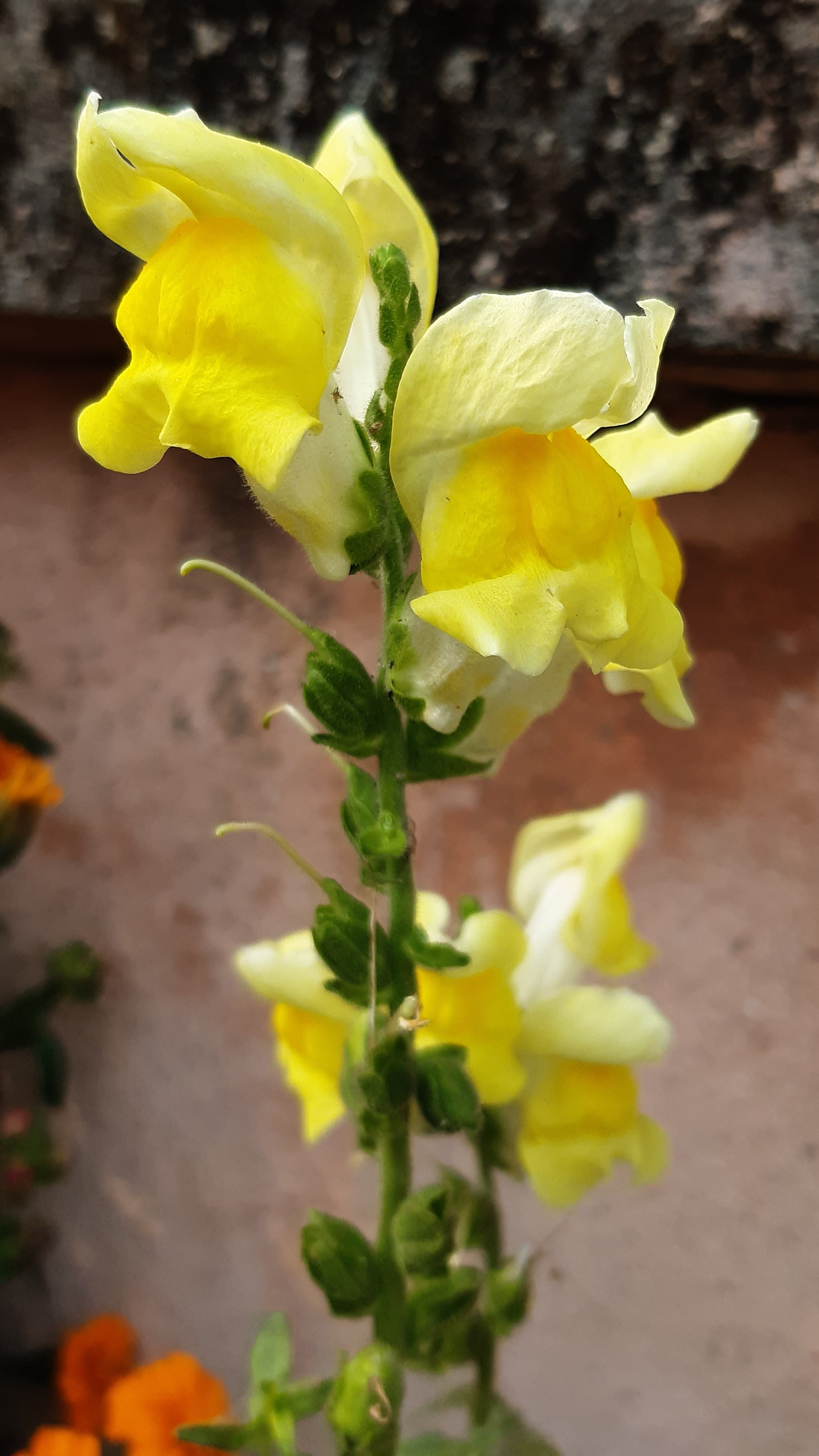
Yellow snapdragon flower

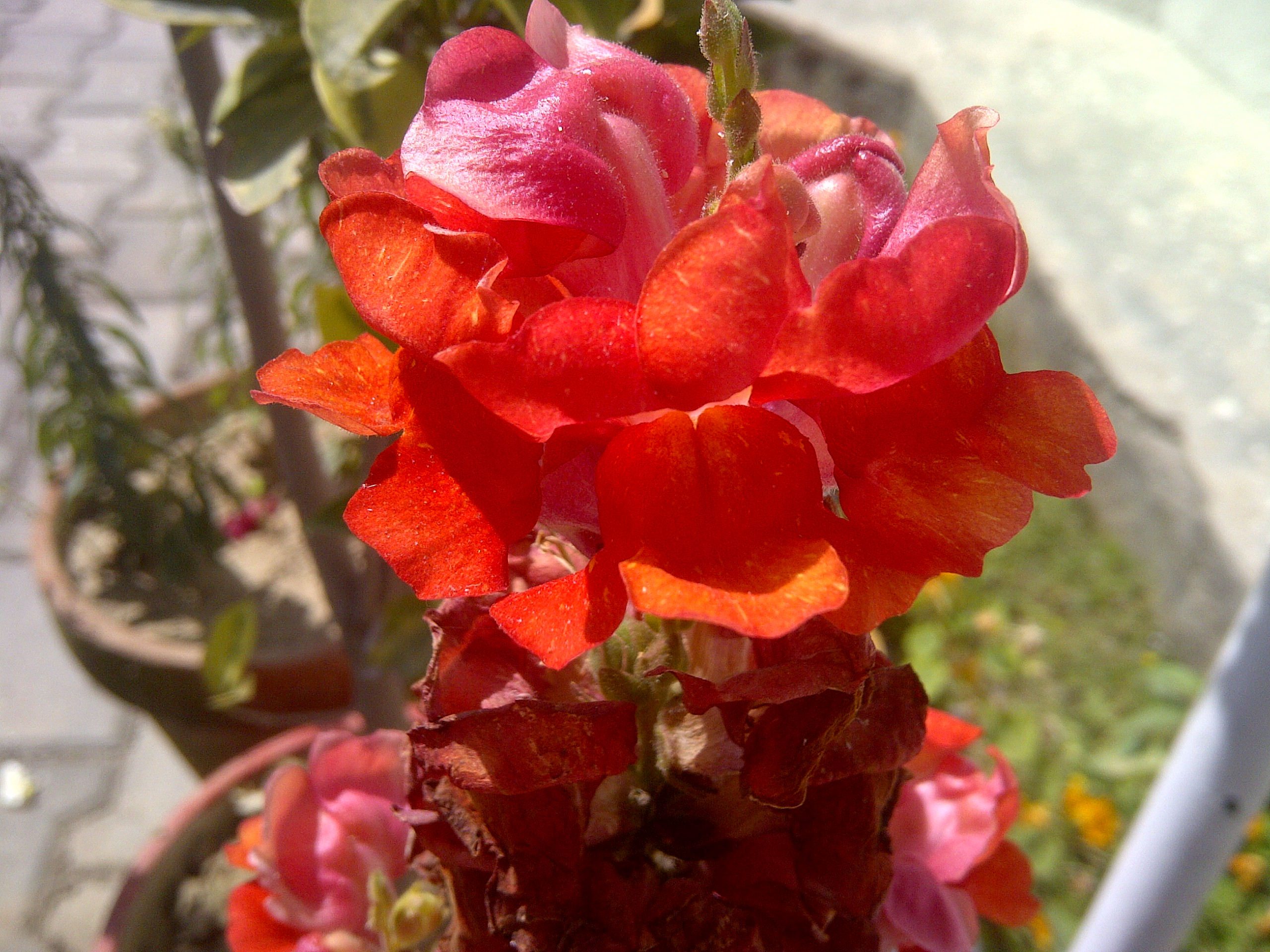
Variety in Pakistan

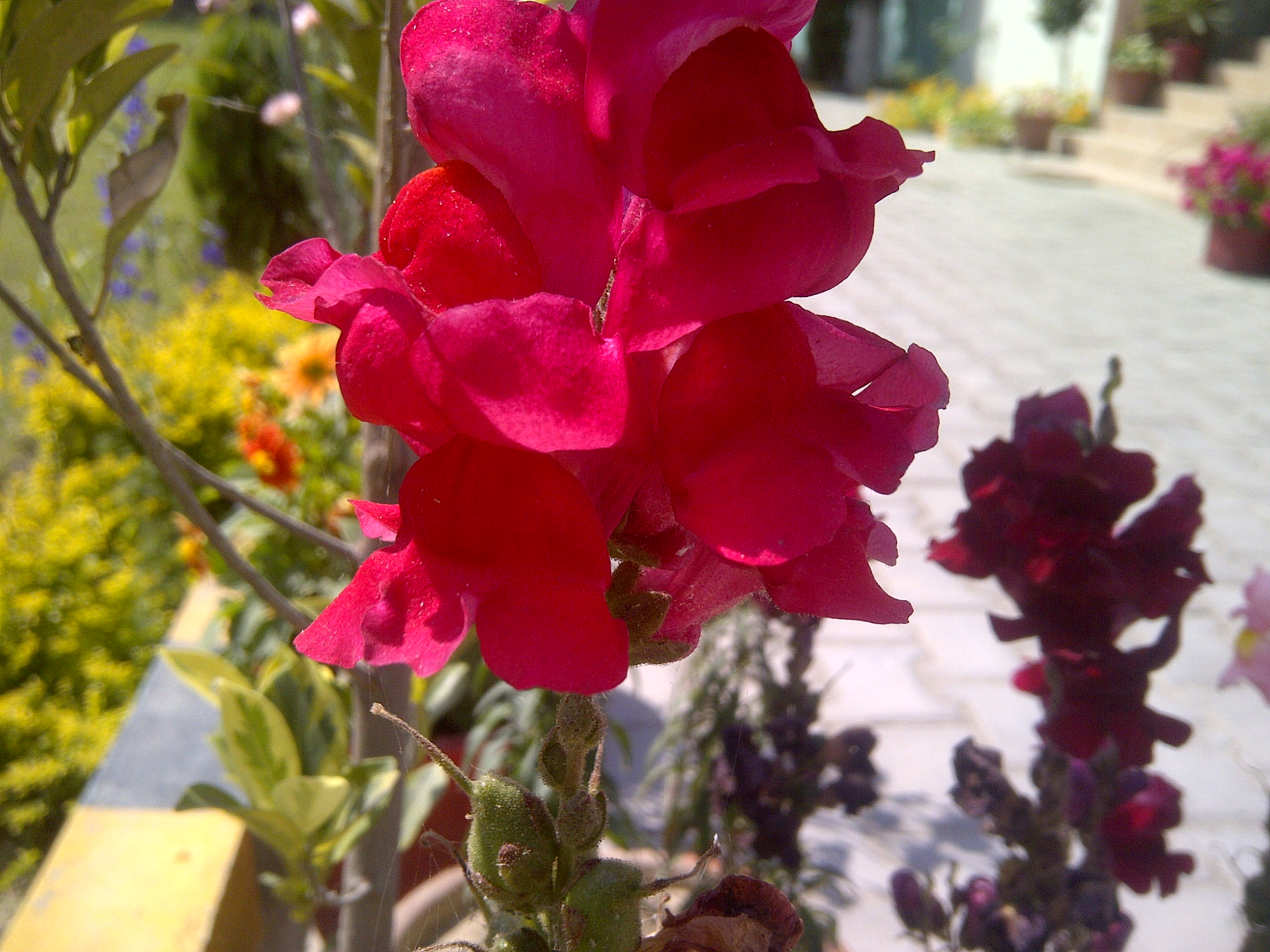
Variety in Pakistan

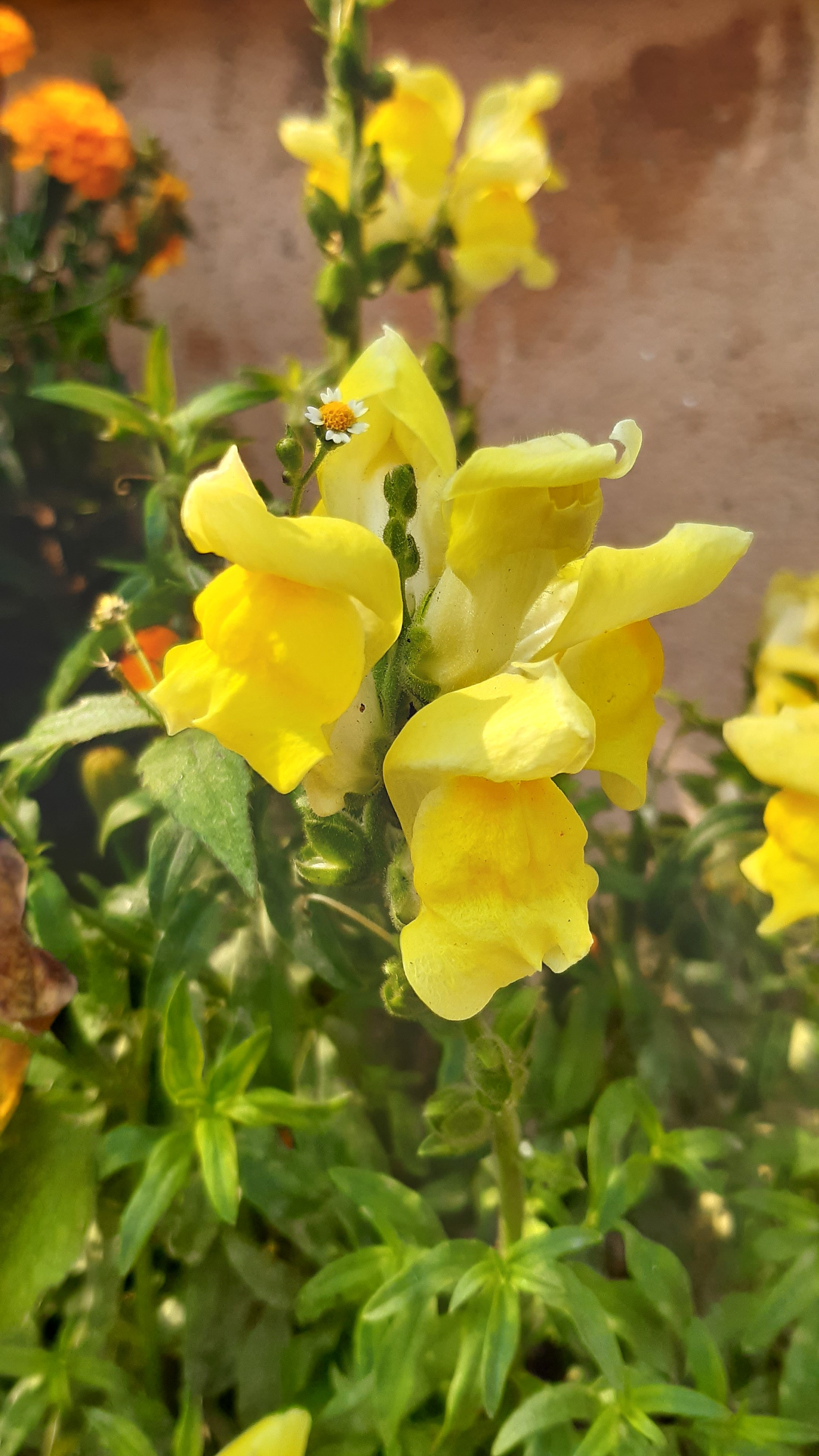
Yellow snapdragon flower

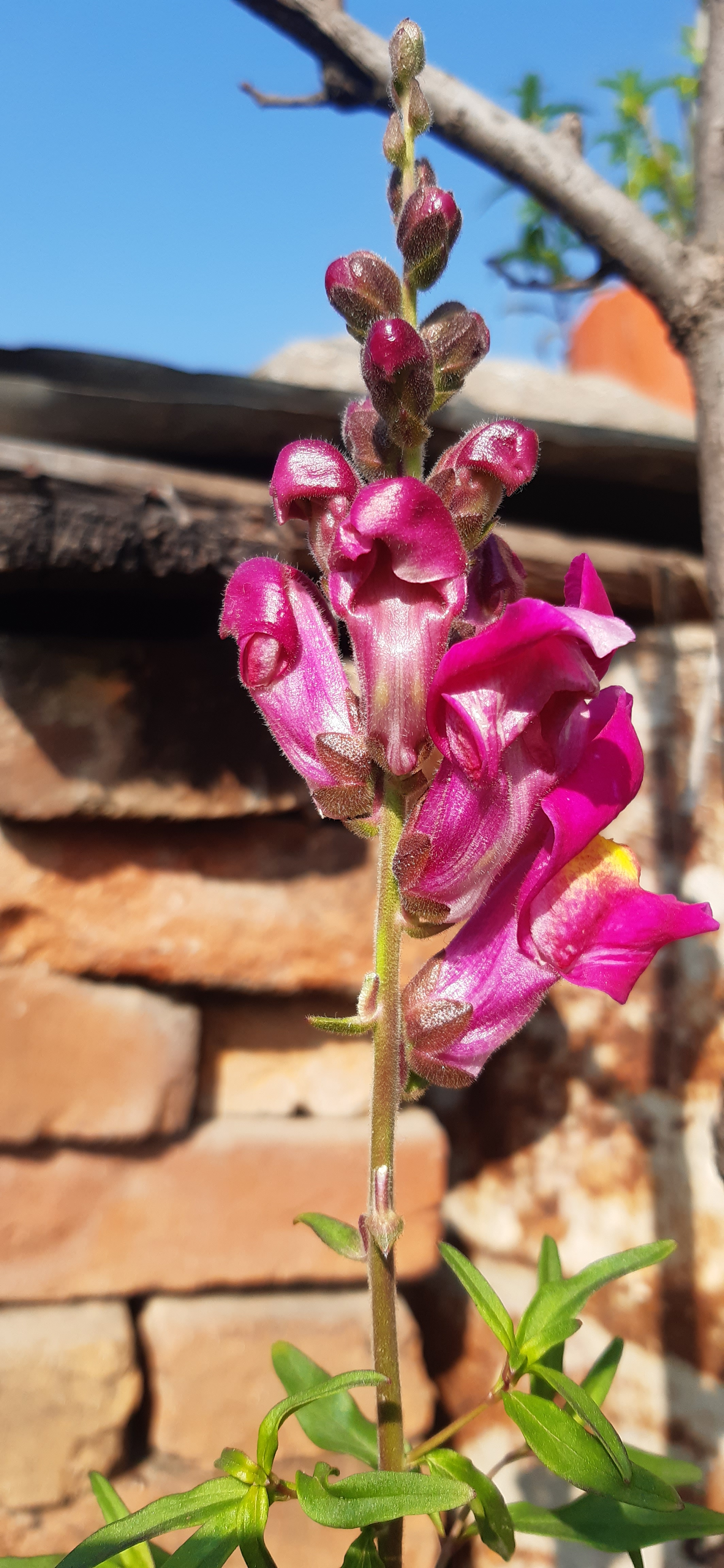
Pink snapdragon flower

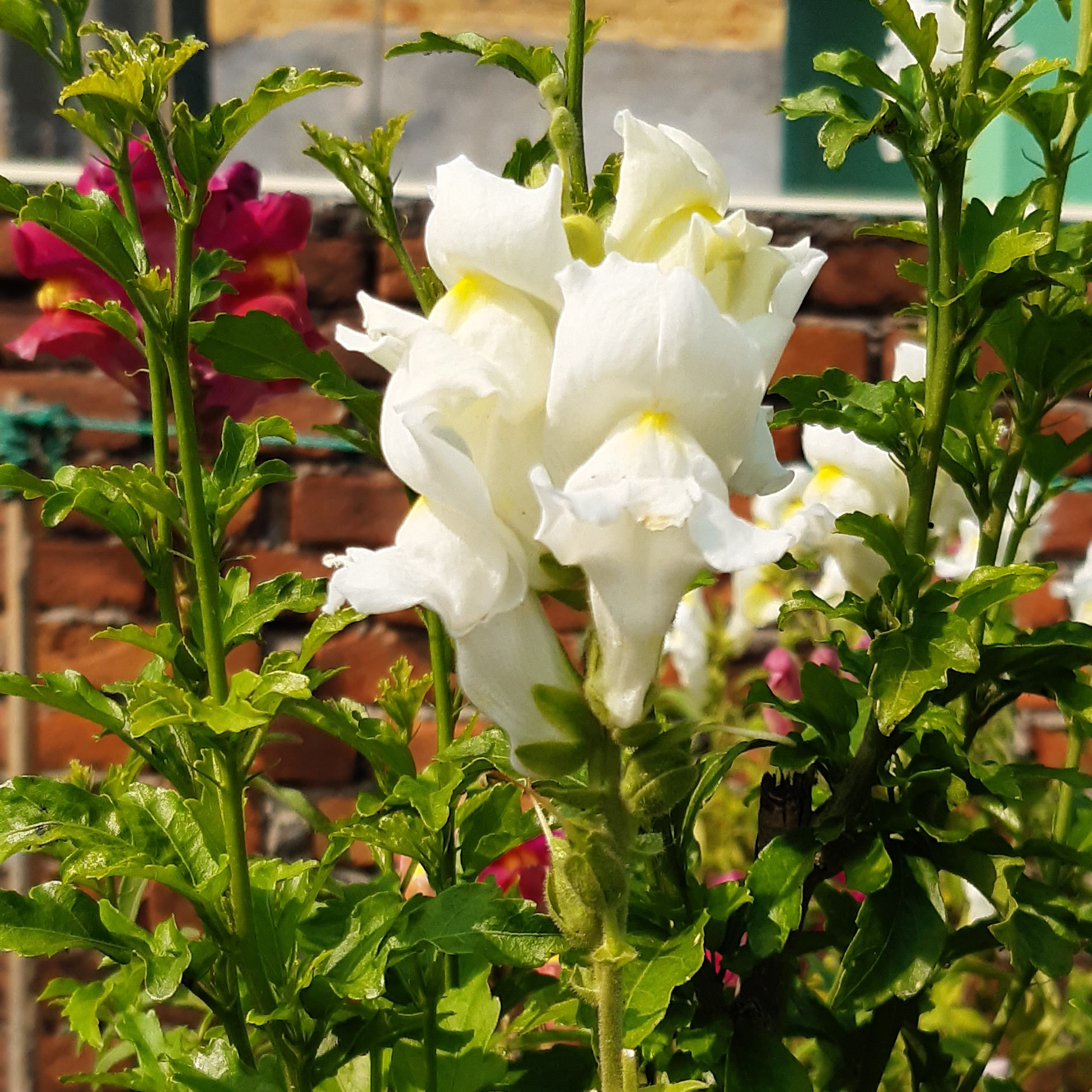
White snapdragon flower

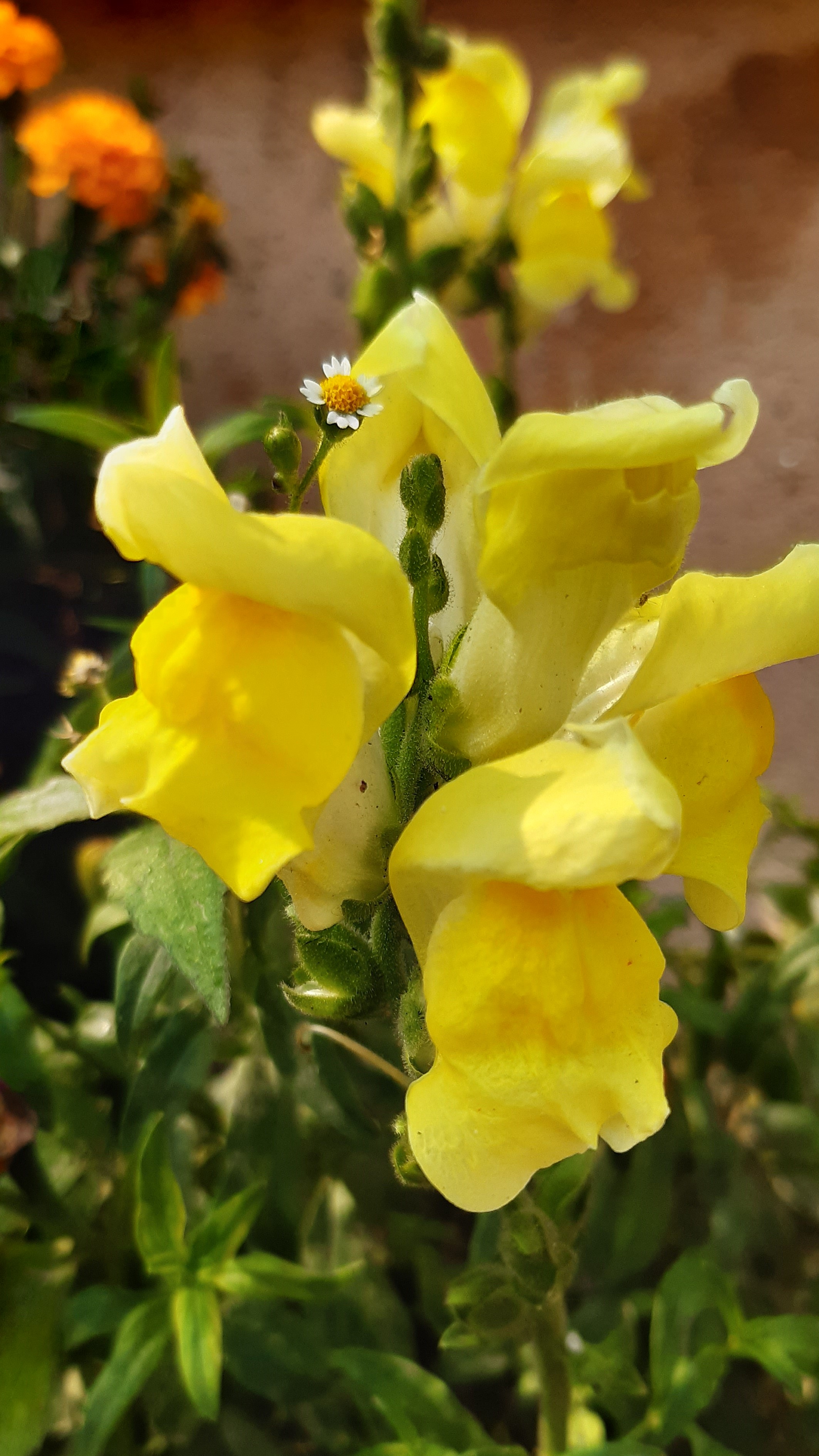
Yellow snapdragon flower

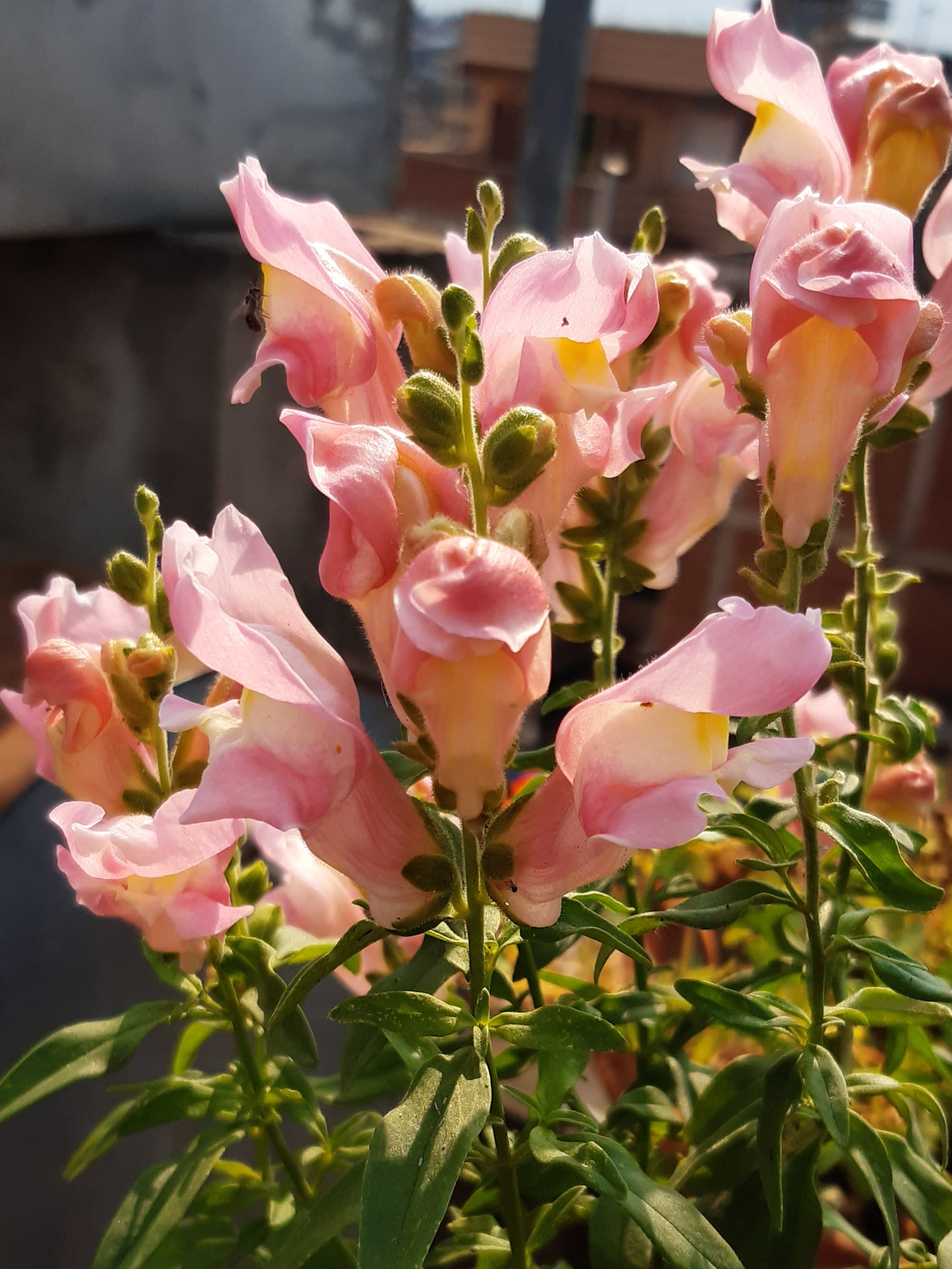
Pink snapdragon flower

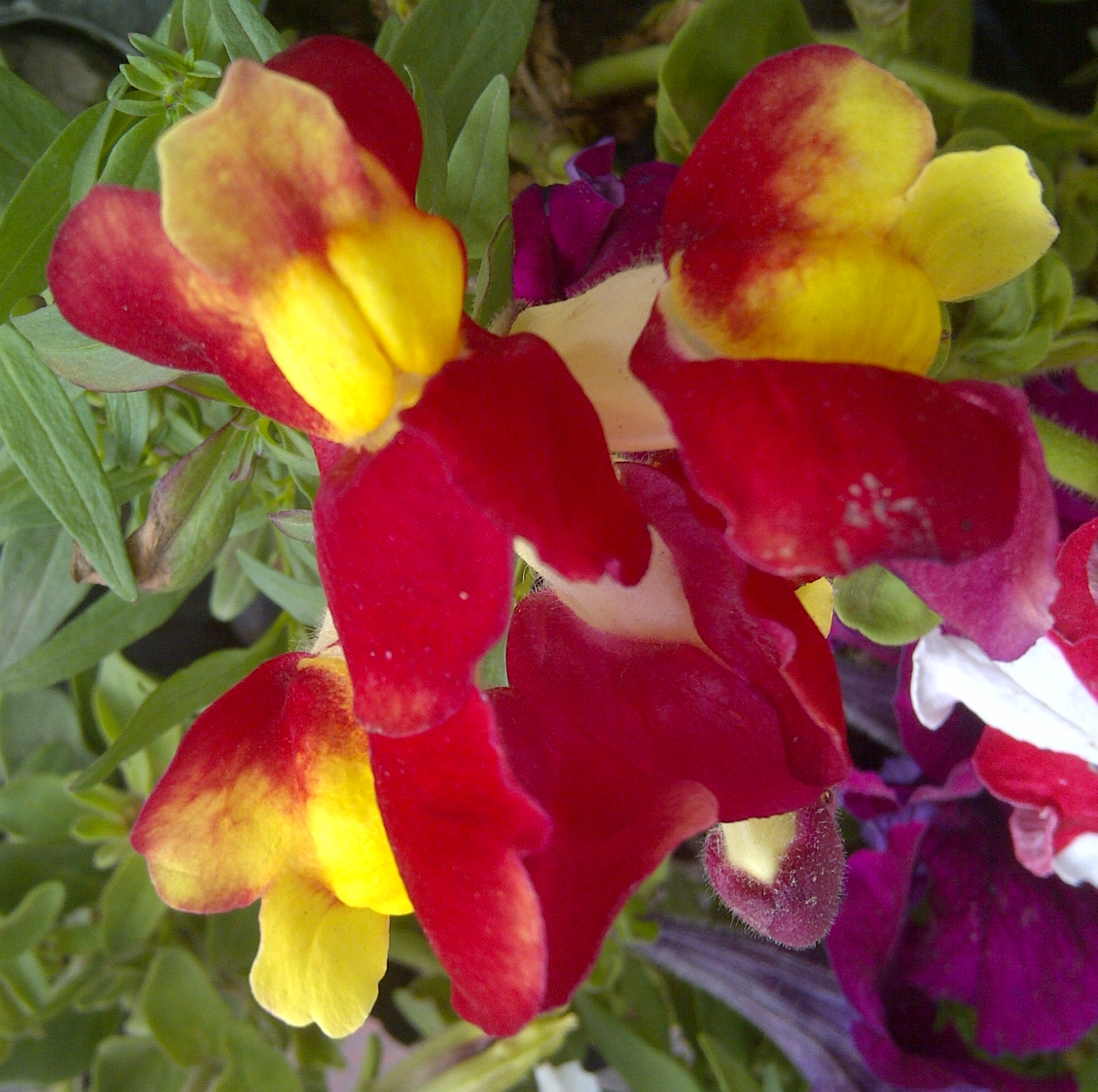
Antirrhinum in Pakistan

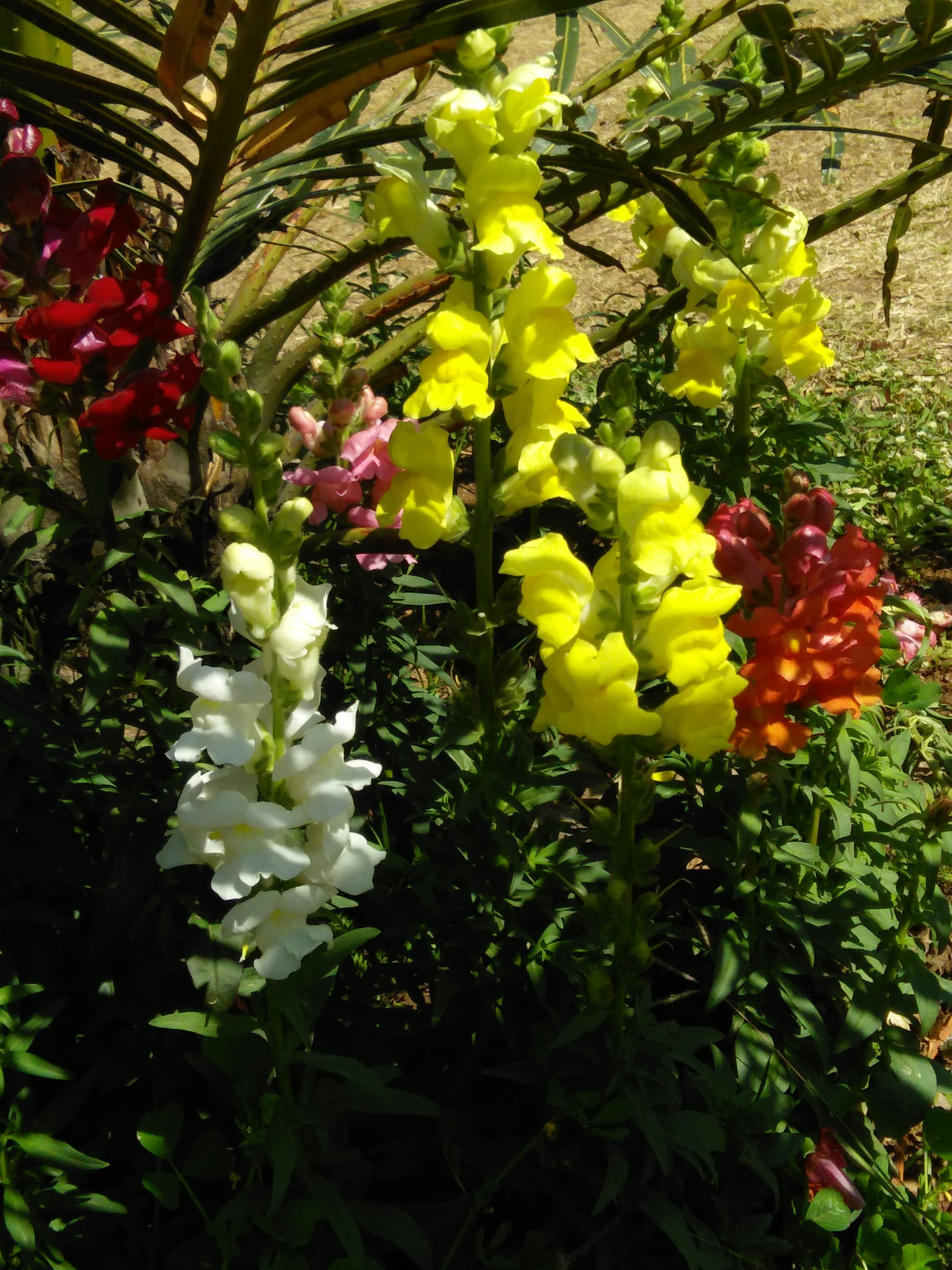
Snapdragon cultivar in India

== Sources ==
- Sutton, D.A. (1988) A Revision of the Tribe Antirrhineae. Oxford: OUP.
- Rothmaler W. 1956. Taxonomische Monographie der Gattung Antirrhinum. Akademie-Verlag, Berlin, Germany.
- Romo, A.; Stubing, G.; Peris, J. B. (1995). "A new species of Antirrhinum (Scrophulariaceae) from North Morocco". Annales Botanici Fennici. 32: 165–168.
- Albach, D. C.; Meudt, H. M.; Oxelman, B. (2005). "Piecing together the "new" Plantaginaceae". American Journal of Botany. 92 (2): 297–315. Bibcode:2005AmJB...92..297A. doi:10.3732/ajb.92.2.297. PMID 21652407.
- Doaigey, A. R.; Harkiss, K. J. (December 1991). "Application of epidermal characters to the taxonomy of European species of Antirrhinum (Scrophulariaceae)". Nordic Journal of Botany. 11 (5): 513–524. Bibcode:1991NorJB..11..513D. doi:10.1111/j.1756-1051.1991.tb01258.x.
- Vargas, P.; Rosselló, J. A.; Oyama, R.; Gũemes, J. (2004). "Molecular evidence for naturalness of genera in the tribe Antirrhineae (Scrophulariaceae) and three independent evolutionary lineages from the New World and the Old" (PDF). Plant Systematics and Evolution. 249 (3–4): 151–172. Bibcode:2004PSyEv.249..151V. doi:10.1007/s00606-004-0216-1. ISSN 0378-2697. S2CID 20328396.
