= Deaths in March 2007 =

The following is a list of notable deaths in March 2007.

Entries for each day are listed alphabetically by surname. A typical entry lists information in the following sequence:

- Name, age, country of citizenship at birth, subsequent country of citizenship (if applicable), reason for notability, cause of death (if known), and reference.

== March 2007 ==
=== 1 ===
- Manuel Bento, 58, Portuguese football goalkeeper (Portugal, S.L. Benfica), cardiac arrest.
- Otto Brandenburg, 72, Danish singer and actor.
- Colette Brosset, 85, French actress.
- Eddie Firestone, 86, American actor (Gunsmoke, Dallas, Duel), heart and respiratory failure.
- George Gabb, 79, Belizean artist, sculptor and writer, cardiac arrest.
- Sir Sydney Gun-Munro, 90, Vincentian politician, Governor-General of Saint Vincent and the Grenadines (1979–1985), after long illness.
- Harold Michelson, 87, American production designer (Terms of Endearment, Star Trek: The Motion Picture, Planes, Trains & Automobiles).
- Tinos Rusere, 61, Zimbabwean Deputy Minister for Mines and Environment, kidney failure.
- Bobby Speight, 76, American basketball player (NC State) and businessman, cancer.

=== 2 ===
- Doris Anderson, 85, Canadian feminist, writer and editor of Chatelaine, pulmonary fibrosis.
- Dave Griffiths, 43, British boxer and Olympian (1984).
- Thomas S. Kleppe, 87, American Secretary of Interior (1975–1977), Representative from North Dakota, Alzheimer's disease.
- Clem Labine, 80, American baseball pitcher (Brooklyn and LA Dodgers), complications of brain surgery.
- Mike Mooney, 37, American football player with Georgia Tech and the 1993 San Diego Chargers.
- Ivan Safronov, 51, Russian defence correspondent for Kommersant, fall from building.
- William C. Sturtevant, 80, American Smithsonian Institution curator, emphysema.
- Henri Troyat, 95, French writer and historian, member of the Académie française.

=== 3 ===
- Osvaldo Cavandoli, 87, Italian cartoonist.
- Jim Kaldis, 74, Australian politician.
- Benito Lorenzi, 81, Italian football striker (Italy, Inter Milan).
- Gene Oliver, 71, American baseball player in the 1960s, complications from lung surgery.
- Türkan Rado, 91, Turkish writer, educator and jurist.
- Saul Swimmer, 70, American documentary filmmaker (The Concert for Bangladesh), heart failure.
- Marjabelle Young Stewart, 82, American etiquette authority and author, pneumonia.

=== 4 ===
- Natalie Bodanya, 98, American operatic soprano.
- H. E. Carter, 96, American biochemist.
- Thomas Eagleton, 77, American Senator for Missouri (1969–1987), heart and respiratory complications.
- Bob Hattoy, 56, American President of California Fish & Game Commission, AIDS activist, complications from AIDS.
- Richard Joseph, 53, British video games soundtrack composer, lung cancer.
- Sunil Kumar Mahato, 41, Indian parliamentarian, shot.
- Tadeusz Nalepa, 63, Polish blues and rock singer, after long illness.
- Robert Prince, 77, American composer.
- John Thow, 57, American composer.
- Renee Williams, 29, American heaviest woman in the world, heart attack.
- Ian Wooldridge, 75, British sports journalist, cancer.

=== 5 ===
- Alan Black, 64, British disc jockey.
- Joseph H. Conlin, 79, American impresario and opera director.
- Yvan Delporte, 78, Belgian editor-in-chief of Spirou magazine (1956–1968).
- Milton N. Hopkins, 80, American ornithologist and farmer.
- Ivo Lorscheiter, 79, Brazilian Catholic Bishop and advocate of liberation theology, multiple organ failure.
- Ivan Supek, 91, Croatian scientist, philosopher and writer.

=== 6 ===
- Jean Baudrillard, 77, French postmodernist philosopher and sociologist.
- Allen Coage, 63, American-born Olympic judo bronze medalist (1976), and professional wrestler known as "Bad News Brown".
- Ernest Gallo, 97, American co-founder of E & J Gallo Winery.
- Pierre Moinot, 86, French novelist elected to Académie française.
- Ray Stern, 74, American professional wrestler, complications from heart surgery.

=== 7 ===
- Graham Botting, 91, New Zealand cricketer and hockey player.
- Bill Chinnock, 59, American singer-songwriter.
- Shane Cross, 20, Australian street skateboarder, motorcycle collision.
- Paul deLay, 55, American blues harmonica player, leukemia.
- Frigyes Hidas, 78, Hungarian composer.
- Emil Mailho, 97, American baseball player.
- Neil North, 74, British actor (The Winslow Boy, Tom Brown's Schooldays, Billy Elliot).
- Andy Sidaris, 76, American film director, throat cancer.
- John Simpson, 79, British army officer, Director Special Forces.
- Paul Sykes, 60, English heavyweight boxer.
- Carla Thorneycroft, Lady Thorneycroft, 93, Italian–born British philanthropist.
- Billy Walkabout, 57, Cherokee-American highly decorated veteran of the Vietnam War, pneumonia and renal failure.
- Notable people killed in the crash of Garuda Indonesia Flight 200:
  - Morgan Mellish, 36, Australian Walkley Award-winning journalist for The Australian Financial Review.
  - Elizabeth O'Neill, 37, Australian diplomat.
  - Allison Sudradjat, 40–41, Australian public servant, head of AusAID in Indonesia.

=== 8 ===
- Taufik Cotran, 80, Palestinian-born British judge, Chief Justice of Belize (1986–1990).
- Alejandro Cruz, 82, Mexican professional wrestler known as "The Black Shadow", pneumonia.
- John Inman, 71, British actor (Are You Being Served?), hepatitis A.
- Pino Lancetti, 74, Italian fashion designer.
- Tom Moldvay, 58, American writer of Dungeons & Dragons books and modules (revised version of Palace of the Silver Princess).
- Harold M. Ryan, 96, American politician, U.S. Representative from Michigan (1961–1965), congestive heart failure.
- Richard Trexler, 74, American historian of the Florentine Renaissance, complications from a kidney transplant.
- Vicky Vanita, 59, Greek actress.
- John Vukovich, 59, American baseball player and coach, brain tumor complications.
- Christopher Barrios Jr., 6, American murder victim, murder.

=== 9 ===
- Rosy Afsari, 60, Bangladeshi film actress, kidney failure.
- Mark Binstein, 72, American basketball coach and manager (Pittsburgh Condors).
- Brad Delp, 55, American singer (Boston), suicide by carbon monoxide poisoning.
- Ron Evans, 67, Australian chairman of the AFL Commission, former Essendon chairman and player, abdominal cancer.
- Glen Harmon, 86, Canadian ice hockey player (Montreal Canadiens).
- John Huzvar, 77, American football player (Philadelphia Eagles, Baltimore Colts).
- Jack Kirby, 84, American football player (USC Trojans, Green Bay Packers).
- Jeanne Hopkins Lucas, 71, American politician, first black woman to serve in the Senate of North Carolina.
- Thomas B. Mason, 88, American attorney.
- Ulpio Minucci, 89, Italian-born composer best known for work on Robotech, natural causes.
- Juan Carlos Portantiero, 73, Argentine sociologist, renal failure.
- Malaetasi Togafau, American Samoan Attorney General, judge and legislator, cancer.

=== 10 ===
- Buddy Allin, 62, American golfer, winner of five PGA Tour events, cancer.
- Francis Clark Howell, 82, American anthropologist.
- Richard Jeni, 49, American comedian and actor (The Mask, Bird, Dad's Week Off), suicide by gunshot.
- Ernie Ladd, 68, American football player (San Diego Chargers, Kansas City Chiefs) and professional wrestler (NWA), cancer.
- Lanna Saunders, 65, American soap opera actress (Days of Our Lives), multiple sclerosis.
- John Soares, 88, American racing driver.
- Angela Webber, 52, Australian comedian and writer, cancer.

=== 11 ===
- Dave Creedon, 87, Irish hurler (Cork), All-Ireland Champions (1952–1954), natural causes.
- Friedrich Krischan, 86, Austrian Olympic cross-country skier (1952).
- Martha B. Sosman, 56, American judge, member of the Massachusetts Supreme Judicial Court, breast cancer.

=== 12 ===
- Arnold Drake, 83, American comic book writer (Doom Patrol, Deadman, Guardians of the Galaxy), pneumonia and septic shock.
- René Duhamel, 72, French rower and Olympian (1960, 1964).
- Vilma Ebsen, 96, American actress, sister and dancing partner of Buddy Ebsen.
- Jack Gaster, 99, British communist politician and solicitor.
- Preah Maha Ghosananda, 77, Cambodian Buddhist Sangharaja and Nobel Peace Prize nominee.
- Betty Hutton, 86, American singer/actress (The Miracle of Morgan's Creek), complications from colon cancer.
- Norm Larker, 76, American baseball player (Los Angeles Dodgers).
- Juan Enrique Lira, 79, Chilean Olympic shooter.
- Antonio Ortiz Mena, 99, Mexican Finance Secretary (1958–1970), IDB President (1971–1987), complications from a fall.
- Yeap Ghim Guan, 66, Malaysian lawyer and politician, founding member of the DAP, complications from a stroke.

=== 13 ===
- Jacques Carbonneau, 78, Canadian Olympic cross-country skier (1952).
- Princess Catherine Ivanovna of Russia, 91, Russian princess.
- Herbert Fux, 79, Austrian actor and politician.
- Terry Major-Ball, 74, British banker and author, brother of former Prime Minister John Major, cancer.
- Wendy Russell Reves, 90, American philanthropist.
- John McHardy Sinclair, 73, British English language scholar, cancer.
- Arnold Skaaland, 82, American professional wrestler.
- Nicole Stéphane, 83, French actress (Le Silence de la mer).

=== 14 ===
- Chet Anderson, 62, American football player (Minnesota Golden Gophers, Pittsburgh Steelers).
- Lucie Aubrac, 94, French member of the Resistance during World War II.
- Roger Beaufrand, 98, French Olympic cyclist (1928), oldest Olympic champion at time of death.
- Tommy Cavanagh, 78, British football player and manager of Burnley.
- Lloyd Eaton, 88, American college football coach.
- Sa'dun Hammadi, 76, Iraqi Prime Minister (1991), leukemia.
- Fitzgerald "Mighty Terror" Henry, 86, Trinidadian calypso musician.
- Gareth Hunt, 65, British actor (The New Avengers), pancreatic cancer.
- Ron McEwin, 79, Australian footballer.
- Birk Sproxton, 63, Canadian author (Phantom Lake: North of 54) and educator, heart attack.

=== 15 ===
- Blanquita Amaro, 83, Cuban-born actress and dancer, heart attack.
- Bonaventure Luo Juan, 89, Chinese Catholic priest and bishop, renal failure and heart and lung weakness.
- Alice Backes, 83, American actress (Bachelor Father).
- Sally Clark, 42, British solicitor wrongly convicted of killing two of her sons.
- Charles Harrelson, 68, American convicted murderer, heart attack.
- Jay Kennedy, 50, American editor-in-chief of King Features Syndicate, drowning.
- Bowie Kuhn, 80, American Major League Baseball commissioner (1969–1984), respiratory failure.
- Orlando "Marty" Martínez, 65, Cuban-born American baseball player and manager.
- Jack Metcalf, 79, American Republican Representative from Washington (1995–2001), complications of Alzheimer's disease.
- Datuk Wira Poh Ah Tiam, 55, Malaysian politician, cancer and renal failure.
- Stuart Rosenberg, 79, American film director (Cool Hand Luke, The Amityville Horror, The Pope of Greenwich Village), heart attack.
- Herman Stein, 91, American film and television composer, heart failure.
- Jean Talairach, 96, French psychiatrist and neurosurgeon.
- William Watson, 89, British sinologist.
- Dirk Wayenberg, 51, Belgian cyclist.
- Ivan Welsh, 67, Australian politician, NSW MLA (1988–1991).

=== 16 ===
- Hubert Glenn, 90, American baseball player.
- Erich Grether, 82, Swiss footballer.
- Sajjadul Hasan, 28, Bangladeshi domestic cricketer, motorcycle accident.
- Pablo Emilio Madero, 85, Mexican politician, president of the National Action Party (1984–1987).
- Sir Arthur Marshall, 103, British aviation engineer.
- Steve McCooke, 88, British Olympic athlete.
- Mou Zuoyun, 94, Chinese basketball player and coach (national team), President of the Chinese Basketball Association.
- Raymond Nasher, 85, American art collector, founder of Nasher Sculpture Center, Nasher Museum of Art and NorthPark Center.
- Manjural Islam Rana, 22, Bangladeshi national cricketer, motorcycle accident.
- Carol Richards, 84, American singer and actress.
- Tupper Saussy, 70, American composer, musician, author, and artist, heart attack.

=== 17 ===
- John Backus, 82, American computer scientist who led the IBM team that developed Fortran.
- Joseph C. Casdin, American businessman and politician, Mayor of Worcester, Massachusetts (1962–1963)
- Crazy Ray, 76, American cheerleading fan of the Dallas Cowboys, diabetes and cardiovascular disease.
- Jim Cronin, 55, American conservationist who founded Monkey World, liver cancer.
- Freddie Francis, 89, English cinematographer (Sons and Lovers, Glory, The Elephant Man) and film director, Oscar winner (1961, 1990), stroke.
- Homer Harris, 91, American athlete, first black captain of a Big Ten Conference team, Alzheimer's disease.
- Ernst Haefliger, 87, Swiss operatic tenor, heart failure.
- Tanya Reinhart, 63, Israeli linguist and peace activist, stroke.
- János Szántay, 84, Romanian Olympic fencer.
- Jorge Vázquez, 64, Argentine diplomat and politician.
- John C. Williams, 65, New Zealand cricketer.

=== 18 ===
- Jim Fung, 62, Hong Kong Chinese martial artist and businessman, nasopharyngeal carcinoma.
- Ovidiu Maitec, 81, Romanian sculptor.
- Annemiek Padt-Jansen, 85, Dutch harpist and politician.
- William N. Panzer, 64, American television and film producer, fall.
- Bob Woolmer, 58, British cricketer for England (1975–1981) and Pakistan cricket team coach, heart failure.

=== 19 ===
- Lloyd Best, 73, Trinidadian economist, politician and columnist, prostate cancer.
- Giampaolo Calanchini, 70, Italian Olympic fencer (1960, 1964).
- Calvert DeForest, 85, American actor and comedian.
- Robert Dickson, 62, Canadian writer and poet, cancer.
- Luther Ingram, 69, American R&B singer and songwriter ("(If Loving You Is Wrong) I Don't Want to Be Right"), kidney failure.
- Louis Jäggi, 58, Swiss Olympic cross-country skier (1972).
- Elaine Shore, 79, American actress, tongue cancer.
- Bill Stevenson, 55, Canadian football player, injuries from a fall.
- Shimon Tzabar, 81, Israeli artist, author, poet and former Haaretz columnist, pneumonia.
- Gemunu Wijesuriya, 72, Sri Lankan broadcaster and comedian.

=== 20 ===
- Francis Agu, 42, Nigerian actor, complications from peptic ulcer.
- Albert Baez, 94, American physicist and father of Joan Baez and Mimi Fariña, natural causes.
- Frank Baird, 94, American basketball player.
- Olcott Deming, 98, American diplomat and first Ambassador to Uganda, sepsis.
- Raynald Fréchette, 73, Canadian lawyer, Quebec Superior Court judge, National Assembly of Quebec member, cancer.
- Dora Jelínková, 57, Czech Olympic volleyball player (1972).
- Rita Joe, 75, Canadian Mi'kmaq poet, Parkinson's disease.
- Gilbert E. Patterson, 67, American bishop of Church of God in Christ, heart failure.
- Taha Yassin Ramadan, 69, Iraqi politician and vice-president (1991–2003), execution by hanging.
- John P. Ryan, 70, American actor (Runaway Train, Five Easy Pieces, Batman: Mask of the Phantasm), stroke.
- Ernie Wright, 67, American football offensive lineman in the 1960s, cancer.
- Hawa Yakubu, 59, Ghanaian politician, cancer.

=== 21 ===
- Drew Hayes, 37, American comic book writer/artist (Poison Elves), heart attack.
- Sven O. Høiby, 70, Norwegian journalist and father of Mette Marit, Crown Princess of Norway, lung cancer.
- Dustin J. Lee, 20, United States Marine Corps corporal.
- Catherine Seipp, 49, American conservative columnist, lung cancer.
- William Utermohlen, 73, American and British Painter, pneumonia

=== 22 ===
- Nisar Bazmi, 83, Pakistani composer, kidney failure.
- George R. Bolling, 86, American pilot.
- Oriol de Bolòs, 83, Spanish botanist, pteridologist, and phytosociologist.
- Richard C. Casey, 74, American lawyer and district judge (United States District Court for the Southern District of New York).
- Don Dennis, 65, American baseball player (St. Louis Cardinals), cancer.
- U. G. Krishnamurti, 88, Indian philosopher.
- Daniel Díaz Maynard, 73, Uruguayan politician, Deputy (1990–2005).
- César Peñaranda, 91, Peruvian Olympic cyclist.
- Jay Zeamer Jr., 88, American World War II veteran and Medal of Honor recipient.

=== 23 ===
- Ed Bailey, 75, American baseball player (1953–1966) and Knoxville, Tennessee city councilman (1983–1995), throat cancer.
- Paul Cohen, 72, American mathematician, professor of mathematics at Stanford University.
- Leon Heath, 78, American football player (Oklahoma Sooners, Washington Redskins).
- Attila Kaszás, 47, Hungarian actor, stroke.
- Mao Anqing, 83, Chinese author and son of Mao Zedong.
- Damian McDonald, 34, Australian Olympic cyclist, traffic accident.
- Eric Medlen, 33, American NHRA driver, diffuse axonal injury from car accident.
- Chase Nielsen, 90, American Air Force officer, participant in the Doolittle Raid.
- Robert E. Petersen, 80, American publisher of auto industry and enthusiast magazines, neuroendocrine cancer.
- Walter Turnbull, 62, American founder of the Boys Choir of Harlem, stroke.

=== 24 ===
- Jun Bernardino, 59, Philippine Basketball Association commissioner (1993–2002) and sports executive, heart attack.
- Henson Cargill, 66, American country singer, complications from surgery.
- Mary Dent Crisp, 83, American Republican leader.
- Maurice Flitcroft, 77, British amateur golfer and hoaxer, lung infection.
- Pentti Ikonen, 72, Finnish Olympic swimmer (1952).
- Martin Studach, 62, Swiss Olympic rower, heart failure.

=== 25 ===
- George Kingsley Acquah, 65, Ghanaian Chief Justice from June 2003, cancer.
- Robert Austrian, 90, American epidemiologist, stroke.
- Homer Fuller, 87, American basketball player.
- Jerry Girard, 74, American sports anchor for WPIX television in New York City, esophageal cancer.
- Hank Goodman, 88, American football player (Detroit Lions).
- T. J. Jackson, 64, American football player (Philadelphia Eagles, Washington Redskins) and Olympic athlete (1964).
- Andranik Margaryan, 55, Armenian Prime Minister since 2000, heart attack.
- Marshall Rogers, 57, American comic book artist (Batman, Doctor Strange, Silver Surfer), heart attack.

=== 26 ===
- Beniamino Andreatta, 78, Italian economist and politician (Christian Democracy, Italian People's Party).
- William Barry, 77-78, Irish footballer and Olympian (1948).
- Cha Burns, 50, Scottish guitarist, lung cancer.
- David Green, 85, American political adviser.
- Lindsay Hawker, 22, British teacher, murder victim.
- Lou Jagnow, 96, American basketball player.
- Heinz Schiller, 77, Swiss racing driver.
- Mikhail Ulyanov, 79, Russian actor, intestinal disease.

=== 27 ===
- Hans Hedberg, 89, Swedish sculptor, kidney failure.
- Paul Lauterbur, 77, American chemist and 2003 Nobel Prize Laureate.
- Ransom A. Myers, 54, American-born Canadian fisheries biologist, declining fish stocks expert, brain tumour.
- Raúl Meza Ontiveros, 40, Mexican suspected drug lord and high-ranking leader of the Sinaloa Cartel, shot.
- Faustino Oramas, 95, Cuban singer (Buena Vista Social Club), cancer.
- Aileen Plant, 52, Australian authority on infectious diseases, investigated first official case of SARS in Vietnam.
- Joe Sentieri, 82, Italian singer and actor.
- Hitoshi Ueki, 80, Japanese actor (Ran, Big Joys, Small Sorrows) and comedian, emphysema.
- Charlotte Winters, 109, American veteran, last surviving American female veteran of World War I.

=== 28 ===
- Preben Blach, 86, Danish Olympic field hockey player (1948).
- Cha Chi Ming, 93, Hong Kong businessman, founder and non-executive chairman of HKR International.
- Abe Coleman, 101, Polish-born American professional wrestler during the Great Depression era.
- Delém, 71, Brazilian footballer.
- Enrique Dibos, 74, Peruvian Olympic sports shooter (1960, 1964).
- Eddie Emberg, 85, Canadian ice hockey player (Montreal Canadiens).
- Bill Fisk, 90, American football player and coach.
- Sir Thomas Hetherington, 80, British lawyer, Director of Public Prosecutions (1977–1987).
- Tony Scott, 85, American jazz clarinetist.
- James Thorpe, 79, American politician, member of the Ohio House of Representatives (1967–1974).

=== 29 ===
- Adebayo Adefarati, 76, Nigerian presidential candidate for the Alliance for Democracy party.
- Bangla Bhai, 37, Bangladeshi militant, execution by hanging.
- Lloyd Brown, 105, American last known surviving World War I Navy veteran.
- Howard Goorney, 85, English actor (Fiddler on the Roof, Bedazzled, Little Dorrit).
- Juan Joya, 73, Peruvian footballer.
- Mimi Lerner, 61, Polish-born American operatic mezzo-soprano, complications of a heart tumor.
- Calvin Lockhart, 72, Bahamian actor (Wild at Heart, Coming to America, Predator 2), stroke.
- Myokyo-ni, 86, Austrian Buddhist nun, head of the Zen Centre in London.
- Tosiwo Nakayama, 75, Micronesian politician, first President of the Federated States of Micronesia (1979–1987).
- Shaykh Abdur Rahman, Bangladeshi Islamist militant leader (JMB) until his capture by the RAB, execution by hanging.
- Leslie Waller, 83, American author.

=== 30 ===
- Anton Biersack, 79, German Olympic ice hockey player (1956).
- Basil Catterns, 89, Australian WWII Army leader of the Kokoda Track campaign, father of broadcaster Angela Catterns.
- Chrisye, 57, Indonesian musician, lung cancer.
- Fay Coyle, 73, British footballer for Derry City, Nottingham Forest and Northern Ireland.
- Michael Dibdin, 60, British crime writer.
- Alfréd Fehérvári, 81, Hungarian football player and coach.
- María Julia Hernández, 68, Salvadoran human rights activist, heart attack.
- Ilias Kelesidis, 53, Greek Olympic cyclist (1984).
- Dave Martin, 72, British television writer for Doctor Who and Z-Cars, lung cancer.
- John Roberts, 74, Canadian politician, heart attack.
- DeForest Wheeler Trimingham, 87, Bermudian Olympic sailor.

=== 31 ===
- Patricia Barringer, 82, American baseball player (AAGPBL)
- Phil Cordell, 59, British musician, 1971 hit as Springwater.
- Colette Hué, 74, French Olympic gymnast (1948, 1952).
- Thomas W. Moore, 88, American producer and president of ABC, heart failure.
- Clarence Peaks, 71, American football player (Philadelphia Eagles, Pittsburgh Steelers).
- Lito Sisnorio, 24, Filipino boxer, heart failure after surgery following a knockout.
- Paul Watzlawick, 85, Austrian-born American psychologist and philosopher.
