= David Green =

David or Dave Green may refer to:

== Sportspeople ==
=== Gridiron football ===
- Dave Green (American football) (born 1949), American football punter
- David Green (running back, born 1972), American football running back
- David Green (running back, born 1953), Canadian football running back

=== Cricket ===
- David Green (cricketer, born 1935) (1935–2020), English cricketer
- David Green (cricketer, born 1939) (1939–2016), Welsh cricketer

=== Other sports ===
- David Green (baseball) (1960–2022), Nicaraguan-born baseball player
- David Green (equestrian) (born 1960), Australian Olympic equestrian
- David Green (racing driver) (born 1958), NASCAR race car driver
- Dave Boy Green (born 1953), British boxer

== Arts and entertainment ==
- David Green (director) (born 1948), film director
- David Gordon Green (born 1975), American filmmaker
- Dave Green (director) (born 1983), American film and music video director
- Dave Green (journalist), journalist and broadcaster
- Dave Green (musician) (born 1942), British jazz bassist

== Other people ==
- David Green (civil engineer) (born 1937), British civil engineer
- David Green (lawyer) (born 1954), British prosecutor, director of Serious Fraud Office
- David Green (entrepreneur) (born 1941), entrepreneur & founder of Hobby Lobby Creative Centers
- David Green (political adviser) (1922–2007), adviser to Illinois governor Daniel Walker
- David Leo Green (1951–2014), American politician in Mississippi
- David Green (West Virginia politician), member of the West Virginia House of Delegates
- David Green (social entrepreneur) (born 1956), founder of Project Impact
- David Green (university administrator) (born 1952), vice-chancellor of the University of Worcester
- David Allen Green (born 1971), English lawyer, sceptic and blogger
- David E. Green (1910–1983), American biochemist
- David George Green (born 1951), British think tank CEO
- David Headley Green (1936–2024), Australian geologist
- David S. Green (19th-century), Mississippi legislator and minister
- David W. Green (biochemist), biochemist known for developing isomorphous replacement
- David W. Green (psychologist), British professor of psychology at University College London
- Dave Green (astrophysicist) (born 1959), British astronomer
- Dave Green (police officer) (1938–2012), American undercover police officer
- G. David Green (born 1948), former chairman of the Dartington Hall Trust and The Prince's School of Traditional Arts
- David M. Green (born 1987), Australian comedian
- David Green (Scottish politician), Scottish politician

== See also ==
- David Greene (disambiguation)
- David Grün (1886–1973), birth name of David Ben-Gurion
