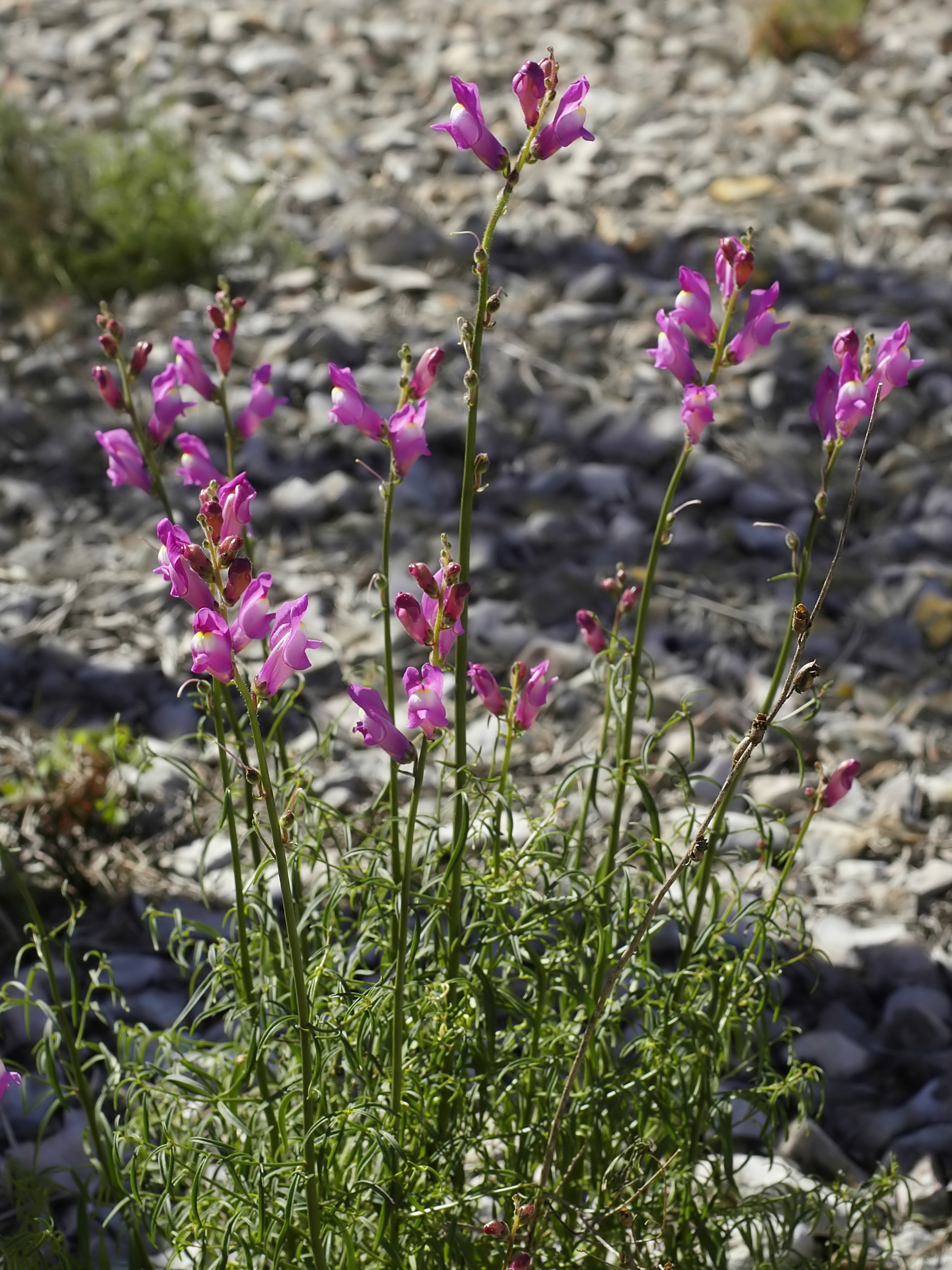
- A flowering Antirrhinum barrelieri in the wild

Scientific classification
- Kingdom: Plantae
- Clade: Embryophytes
- Clade: Tracheophytes
- Clade: Spermatophytes
- Clade: Angiosperms
- Clade: Eudicots
- Clade: Asterids
- Order: Lamiales
- Family: Plantaginaceae
- Genus: Antirrhinum
- Species: A. barrelieri

Binomial name
- Antirrhinum barrelieri Boreau

Synonyms
- List: Antirrhinum barrelieri var. genuinum Rouy; Antirrhinum majus subsp. barrelieri (Boreau) Malag.; Antirrhinum murale proles barrelieri (Boreau) Samp.; Antirrhinum murale subsp. barrelieri (Boreau) Samp.; Antirrhinum barrelieri subsp. litigiosum (Pau) O.Bolòs & Vigo; Antirrhinum barrelieri f. typicum Rothm.; Antirrhinum litigiosum Pau; Antirrhinum majus var. litigiosum (Pau) Maire; Antirrhinum majus subsp. litigiosum (Pau) Rothm.

= Antirrhinum barrelieri =

Species of flowering plant

Antirrhinum barrelieri is a species of perennial flowering plant in the genus Antirrhinum (common snapdragons) in the family Plantaginaceae. Native to northeastern Spain, the species is a subshrub that favors subtropical conditions. A. barrelieri produce stems of between 30 cm (12 in) and 75 cm (30 in) tall, on which narrow leaves and 8 to 20 pink or purplish tubular flowers grow. Flowering and fruiting generally occurs between March and September within the species's native range.

In 1855, the botanist Alexandre Boreau was the first to describe the species with its current name, which Boreau gave the species in honor of the 17th-century biologist Jacques Barrelier. A. barrelieri has been reassigned or synonymized to other Antirrhinum, though genetic evidence has supported its placement as a discrete species. After 1896 descriptions by the botanist Carlos Pau y Español, the name A. barrelieri was applied to southern Iberian Antirrhinum; since a 2020 typification, these populations are now accepted as Antirrhinum controversum. Conversely, the name A. barrelieri has been restored to its original meaning in reference to plants native to northeastern Spain, replacing the Pau's synonym of Antirrhinum litigiosum.

== Description ==
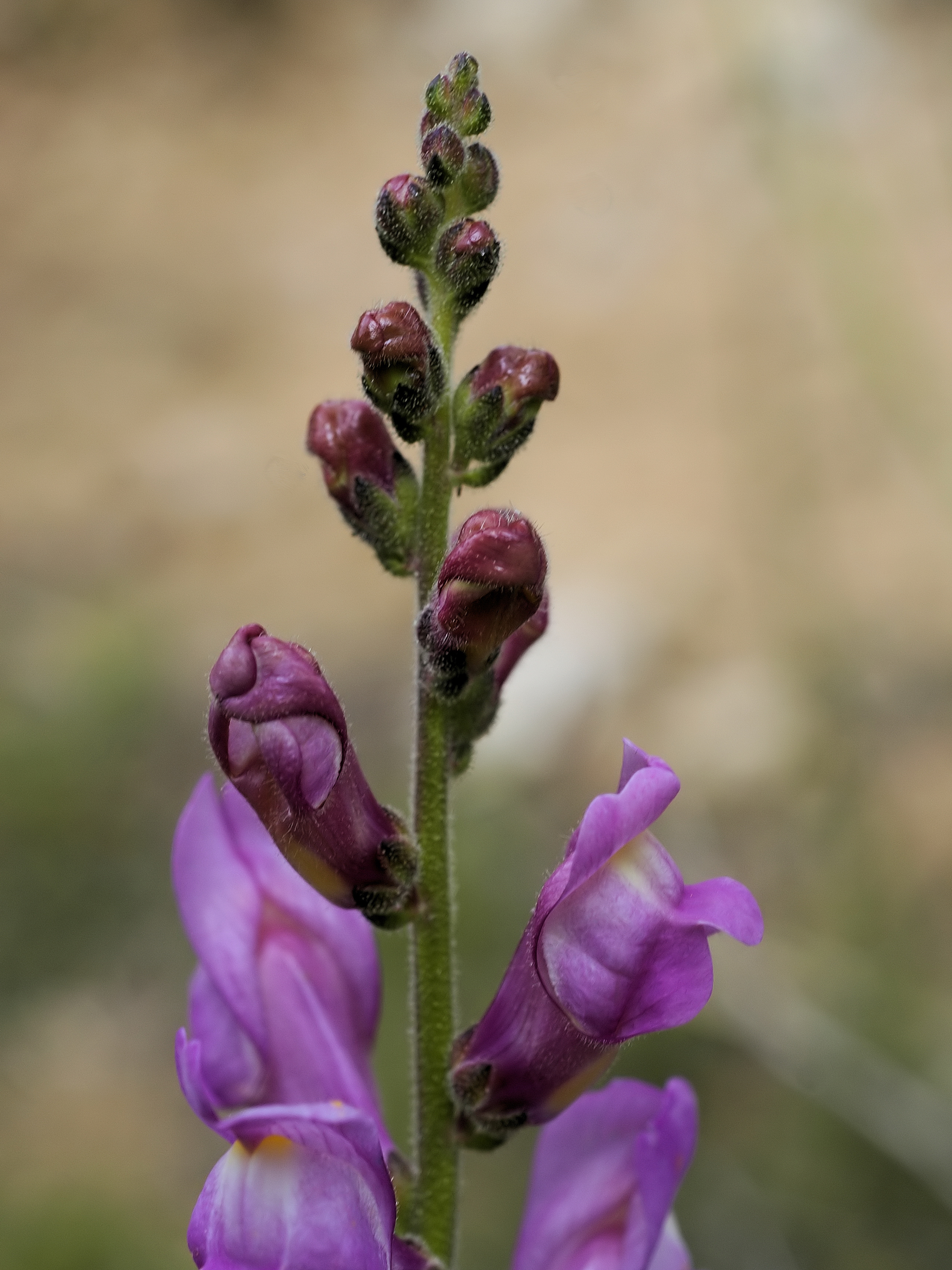
Flowers on an A. barrelieri plant

Antirrhinum barrelieri is a perennial herbaceous plant in the genus Antirrhinum (common snapdragons) of the family Plantaginaceae. Its overall form is that of a subshrub. The plants can produce thick aerial stems that can reach between 30 cm (12 in) and 75 cm (30 in) tall. Each stem features substantial branching and is glabrous (lack coverage in hair-like structures) in the middle of it height, though some pubescence is present at both the base and terminal inflorescences.

On the stems are narrow leaves that measure 10 mm (0.39 in) to 50 mm (2.0 in) long and 1.5 mm (0.059 in) to 5 mm (0.20 in) wide. At the base of the stems, these leaves are arranged in pairs with one on each side of the stem. Further up the stem, the leaves are arranged in an alternating fashion on each side. The leaves have shapes ranging from linear to narrowly lanceolate. Their topsides are green and their bottom faces are purple. This leaf coloring is typical of Antirrhinum.

Antirrhinum plants produce flowers which appear in inflorescences at the terminuses of each stem. These flowers comprise five sepals of unequal size and with a deeply cleft calyx. The overall structure of the flower (the corolla) takes the shape of an open tube. A. barrelieri plants each possess between 8 and 20 pink or purplish flowers. Each flower is borne on a pedicel measuring between 6 mm (0.24 in) and 30 mm (1.2 in) long. The corolla of an A. barrelieri flower, typically between 25 mm (0.98 in) and 35 mm (1.4 in) in diameter, can become whitish towards the base of the tube. The species's flowering and fruiting period spans from March to September in its native range, with marginal observations occurring into December.

Fruiting produces oblong-ovoid capsules that measure 10 mm (0.39 in) to 15 mm (0.59 in) long and 8 mm (0.31 in) to 11 mm (0.43 in) wide. These capsules have woody walls with glandular hairs that can measure up to 0.6 mm (0.024 in) long. The seeds are black and oblong-ovoid in shape, measuring between 0.6 mm (0.024 in) and 0.8 mm (0.031 in) long.

== Taxonomy ==
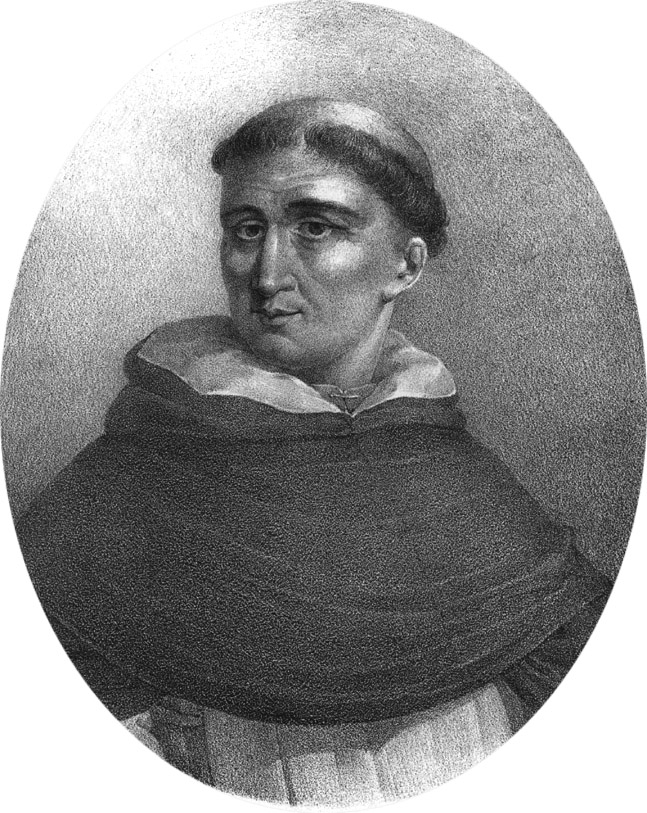
Jacques Barrelier, namesake of the species

In 1855, the French botanist Alexandre Boreau was the first to describe the species as Antirrhinum barrelieri. In his description, published in the Index Seminum of the Jardin des plantes d'Angers, Boreau gave species its binomial to honor the 17th-century French biologist Jacques Barrelier. Boreau synonymized his species description with the polynomial Antirrhinum majus saxatile angustissimis foliis, flore purpurascente minori previously used by Barrelier, as well as referencing Barrelier's illustration no. 637 (Barrelier 1714). Boreau's description relied on seeds collected by the French politician Victorin Larevellière in June 1853 from the Catalonian city of Tortosa which were subsequently cultivated at the garden in Angers.

For more than four decades, eastern Iberian Antirrhinum with linear leaves and pink flowers were described as A. barrelieri. The Spanish botanist Carlos Pau y Español assigned this name to biological specimens collected from the northern areas of what had once been the Kingdom of Valencia in 1889 and 1892. However, Pau reconsidered these assignments in 1896 when revisiting the same specimens alongside additional material collected by Benito Vicioso Trigo and Bernardo Zapater, concluding that they comprised two species, which he named A. litigiosum for the northern Iberian populations and A. controversum for the southern Iberian populations. These assignments were adopted by subsequent Spanish botanists over the succeeding decades.

In 1956, the German botanist Werner Rothmaler assessed Pau's names and held that the northern populations should be considered A. litigiosum (also called A. majus subsp. litigiosum by other authors) and the southern populations were A. barrelieri. The Flora Iberica, accepting Rothmaler's 1956 assessment of the genus for other taxa, retained A. controversum for the southeastern Iberian plants and deemed the name A. barrelieri as the cause of confusion.

A 2020 typification by the Spanish botanists P. Pablo Ferrer-Gallego and Jaime Güemes compared Pau's descriptions and assignments for A. litigiosum and A. controversum against earlier descriptions and assignments to A. barrelieri. Ferrer-Gallego and Güemes determined that, according to Boreau's original description of Antirrhinum barrelieri and the standards of the International Code of Nomenclature for algae, fungi, and plants, A. litigiosum was a synonym of A. barrelieri but accepted A. controversum as a discrete taxa that encompassed the southern populations.

=== Cladistic relationships ===
The boundaries of the genus Antirrhinum (common snapdragons) are disputed. The genus is sometimes considered to comprise a clade (monophyletic group) that spans a concentration of approximately 19 to 25 perennial species natively concentrated in the Western Mediterranean – with most of these narrowly endemic to the Iberian Peninsula – and approximately 19 annual species native to western North America. When the Old and New World species has been considered as a single genus, it has divided into three sections: Antirrhinum and Orontium in the Old World and Saerorhinum in the New World. However, the North American species are sometimes described as belong in their own genus, Sairocarpus.

The genus Antirrhinum, when restricted to only to the Old World, comprises diploid (chromosome number: 2n=16) species that have been divided into two genetic species complexes: Majora (headed by Antirrhinum majus) and Sicula (headed by Antirrhinum siculum). A 2005 genetic study concluded that sufficient allozymic differentiation existed to accept the plants now referred to as A. barrelieri (identified as A. litigiosum in the study) and A. controversum (identified as A. barrelieri in the study) at the rank of species. This study placed both species within the Majora group.

The Old World Antirrhinum species can also be divided in subsections based on morphology. Antirrhinum subsection Antirrhinum comprises large plants generally found in competitive grassland environments that usually possess pink or yellow flowers and large leaves. Antirrhinum subsection Kickxiella encompasses smaller, typically alpine plants with small leaves. The small Streptosepalum subsection comprises plants morphologically intermediary between Antirrhinum and Kickxiella. A 2021 genetic study identified A. barrelieri (identified as A. litigiosum in the study) as morphologically within the subsection Antirrhinum but concluded that a phylogeny based on genetic evidence suggested clades comprised species of varied morphologies within geographic proximity to one another.

== Distribution ==
Antirrhinum barrelieri is found within a native range that includes the northeastern portions of Spain. It favors a subtropical climate and features the morphological adaptions characteristic of grassland species in the Antirrhinum subsection of the genus. Its preferred elevations within its native range span from sea level up to 1,500 m (4,900 ft).

While a population of plants described as A. barrelieri is found in Morocco, this population is so named in reference to morphological similarities with Sierra Nevada populations now accepted as A. controversum. However, a 2021 genetic analysis of Antirrhinum populations around the Mediterranean concluded that the Moroccan A. barrelieri were more closely related to Antirrhinum tortuosum from across the Strait of Gibraltar in the Sierra de Grazalema.
