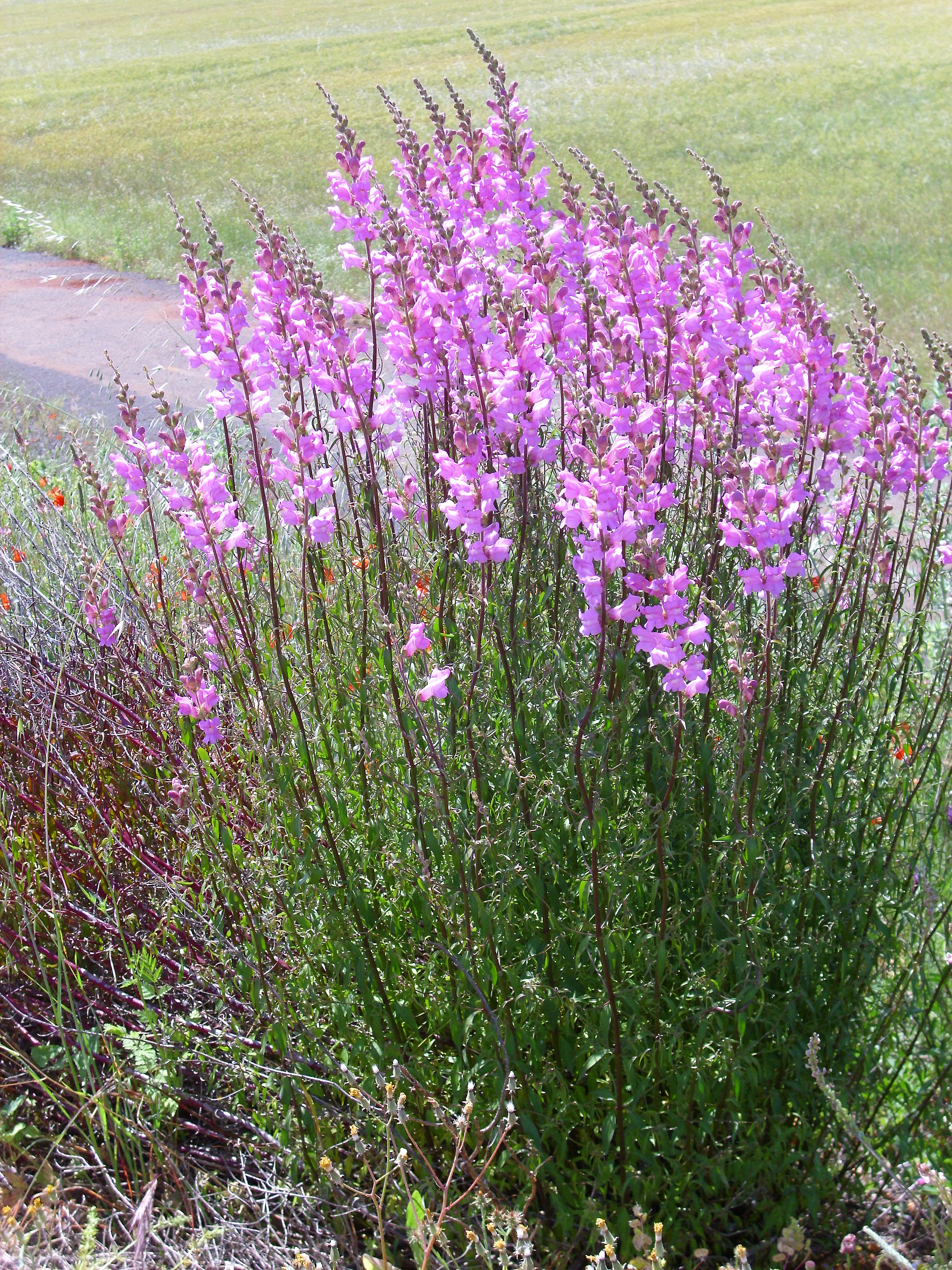

Scientific classification
- Kingdom: Plantae
- Clade: Embryophytes
- Clade: Tracheophytes
- Clade: Spermatophytes
- Clade: Angiosperms
- Clade: Eudicots
- Clade: Asterids
- Order: Lamiales
- Family: Plantaginaceae
- Genus: Antirrhinum
- Species: A. controversum

Binomial name
- Antirrhinum controversum Pau

Synonyms
- List: Antirrhinum barrelieri var. algeriense Samp. ex Pires de Lima; Antirrhinum barrelieri var. cirrhosum Rouy; Antirrhinum barrelieri var. latifolium Willk.; Antirrhinum barrelieri var. piliferum Rouy; Antirrhinum barrelieri f. piliferum (Rouy) Rothm.; Antirrhinum barrelieri var. reeseanum Maire; Antirrhinum boissieri Rothm.; Antirrhinum graniticum subsp. boissieri (Rothm.) Valdés; Antirrhinum hispanicum var. giennense Cuatrec.; Antirrhinum ibanyezii Jiménez & Pau; Antirrhinum majus var. angustifolium Kuntze; Antirrhinum siculum var. purpurascens Coss. ex Nyman

= Antirrhinum controversum =

Species of flowering plant

Antirrhinum controversum is a species of perennial flowering plant in the genus Antirrhinum (common snapdragons) in the family Plantaginaceae. Native to southeastern and southern Spain, Portugal, and northern Morocco, it is a subshrub that favors subtropical biomes. The species produces stems that grow between 35 cm (14 in) and 150 cm (59 in) tall. Growing, flowering, and fruiting between February and November within its native range, the plant produces dense inflorescences of ten to 40 pale-pink flowers at the end of each stem.

== Description ==
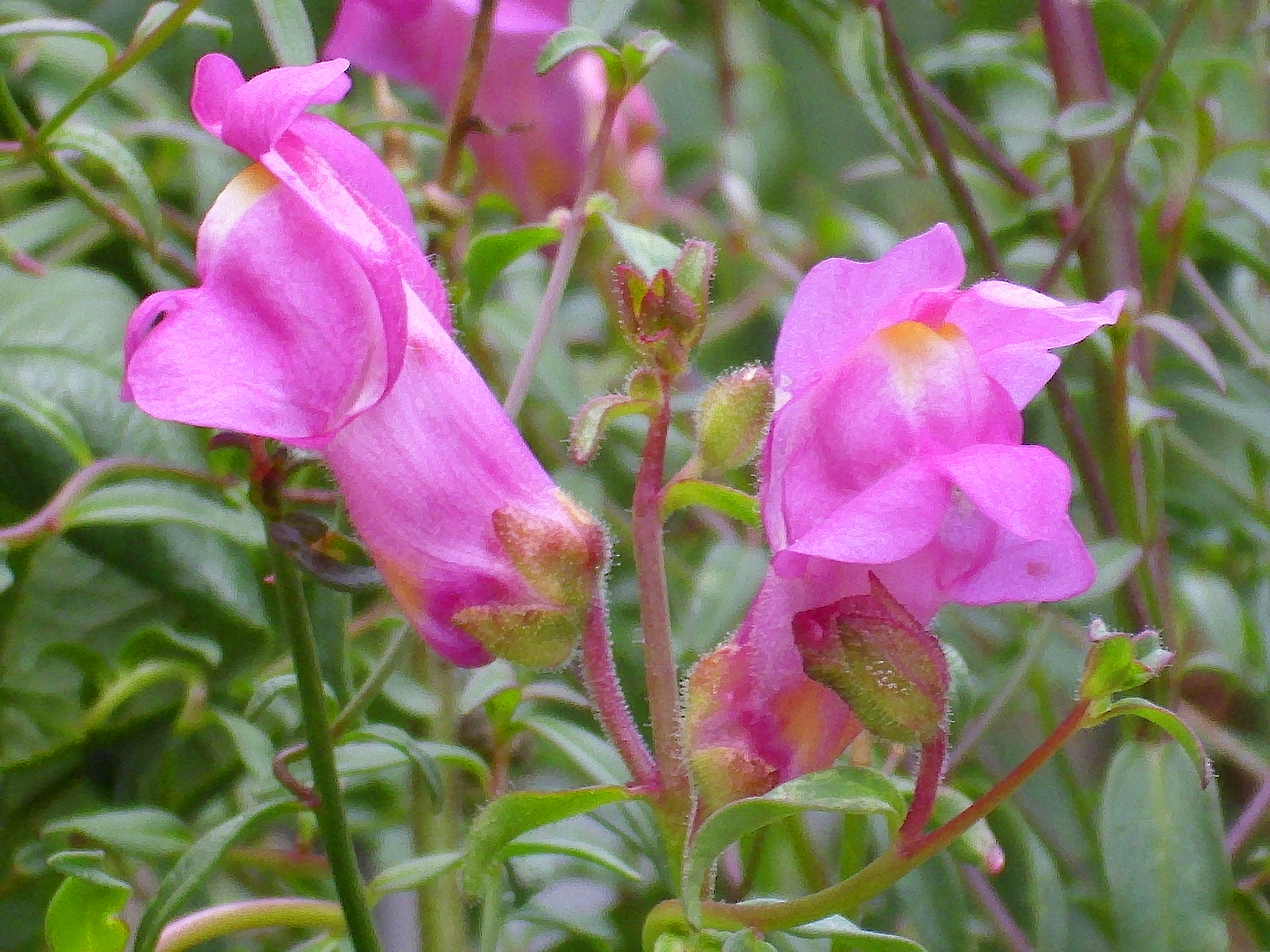
Flowers on an A. controversum plant in the Sierra Madrona, Spain

Antirrhinum controversum is a perennial herbaceous plant species in the genus Antirrhinum (common snapdragons) of the family Plantaginaceae. The overall forms of A. controversum plants are that of subshrubs. Plants in the species produce thick aerial stems that reach between 35 cm (14 in) and 150 cm (59 in) tall. Leaves grow in a mostly alternating pattern on the stems. These leaves are lanceolate in shape, with the typical Antirrhinum coloring of green on their topsides and purple on their bottoms, and measure between 6 mm (0.24 in) and 40 mm (1.6 in) long and between 0.5 mm (0.020 in) and 6 mm (0.24 in) wide.

The inflorescences on Antirrhinum grow at the terminuses of the stems. On A. controversum, ten to 40 flowers densely populate each inflorescence. The flowers are attached to the stem on pedicels measuring between 1 mm (0.039 in) and 3 mm (0.12 in) long and are arranged in an alternating pattern. The flowers are postured in an erect position. The entire structure of each flower (corolla) measures 16 mm (0.63 in) to 24 mm (0.94 in) in diameter. The flowers are colored pale pink, with a white base on the tubular portion attached to the pedicel. Purple veins are also present. The growth period that includes flowering and fruiting occurs between February and November within the species's native range.

Fruiting produces oblong-ovoid capsules that measure 6 mm (0.24 in) to 9 mm (0.35 in) long and 4 m (160 in) to 5 mm (0.20 in) wide. These capsules have woody walls with glandular hairs that can measure up to 0.6 mm (0.024 in) long. The seeds are black and oblong-ovoid in shape, measuring between 0.6 mm (0.024 in) and 0.8 mm (0.031 in) long.

Within Antirrhinum, hybridization between species is frequent. Standard A. controversum plants are morphologically similar to typical A. australe plants, with naturally occurring hybridizations between the two species compounding the difficulty of distinguishing between them.

== Taxonomy ==
In 1896 within the journal Notas Botánicas a la Flora Española, the Spanish botanist Carlos Pau y Español reevaluated Antirrhinum specimens. The specimens included some he had previously identified as Antirrhinum barrelieri as well as other specimens from across a wider Iberian range. Pau decided that A. barrelieri – a name previously applied to morphologically similar populations from across the eastern and southern portions of the Iberian Peninsula – should be divided into two species. Pau described the northeastern Iberian Peninsula plants with the new name A. litigiosum, while southern Iberian plants were described as A. controversum. This initial description of A. controversum, utilizing specimens collected by Pietro Porta and Gregorio Rigo, described distinctions between this species and other Antirrhinum.

In 1956, the German botanist Werner Rothmaler assessed Pau's names and held that the northern populations should be considered A. litigiosum (also called A. majus subsp. litigiosum by other authors) and the southern populations were A. barrelieri. The Flora Iberica, accepting Rothmaler's 1956 assessment of the genus for other taxa, retained A. controversum for the southeastern Iberian plants and deemed the name A. barrelieri as the cause of confusion.

A 2020 typification by the Spanish botanists P. Pablo Ferrer-Gallego and Jaime Güemes compared Pau's descriptions and assignments for A. litigiosum and A. controversum against earlier descriptions and assignments to A. barrelieri. Ferrer-Gallego and Güemes determined that, according to Boreau's original description of Antirrhinum barrelieri and the standards of the International Code of Nomenclature for algae, fungi, and plants, A. litigiosum was a synonym of A. barrelieri but accepted A. controversum as a discrete taxa that applied to the southern Iberian populations.

=== Cladistic relationships ===
The boundaries of the genus Antirrhinum (common snapdragons) are disputed. The genus is sometimes considered to comprise a clade (monophyletic group) that spans a concentration of approximately 19 to 25 perennial species natively concentrated in the Western Mediterranean – with most of these narrowly endemic to the Iberian Peninsula – and approximately 19 annual species native to western North America. When the Old and New World species has been considered as a single genus, it has divided into three sections: Antirrhinum and Orontium in the Old World and Saerorhinum in the New World. However, the North American species are sometimes described as belong in their own genus, Sairocarpus.

The genus Antirrhinum, when restricted to only to the Old World, comprises diploid (chromosome number: 2n=16) species that have been divided into two genetic species complexes: Majora (headed by Antirrhinum majus) and Sicula (headed by Antirrhinum siculum). A 2005 genetic study concluded that sufficient allozymic differentiation existed to accept the plants now referred to as A. barrelieri (identified as A. litigiosum in the study) and A. controversum (identified as A. barrelieri in the study) at the rank of species. This study placed both species within the Majora group.

The Old World Antirrhinum species can also be divided in subsections based on morphology. Antirrhinum subsection Antirrhinum comprises large plants generally found in competitive grassland environments that usually possess pink or yellow flowers and large leaves. Antirrhinum subsection Kickxiella encompasses smaller, typically alpine plants with small leaves. The small Streptosepalum subsection comprises plants morphologically intermediary between Antirrhinum and Kickxiella. A 2021 genetic study identified A. controversum (identified as A. barrelieri in the study) as morphologically within the subsection Antirrhinum but concluded that a phylogeny based on genetic evidence suggested clades comprised species of varied morphologies within geographic proximity to one another. The study determined that, consistent with the frequent hybridization within the genus, the A. controversum from the Sierra Nevada had more closely related genetic accessions with the Sierra Nevada Kickxiella species than the Sierra Nevada and Moroccan A. controversum had between each other.

== Distribution ==
Antirrhinum controversum has a native range that spans southeastern and southern Spain, Portugal, and northern Morocco. The species favors subtropical biomes. A. controversum is natively found at elevations between 20 m (66 ft) and 1,600 m (5,200 ft) above sea level.
