= Professor Green (disambiguation) =

Professor Green (born 1983) is a British singer and songwriter.

Professor Green may also refer to:

- Ben Green (mathematician) (born 1977), British mathematician
- David W. Green (psychologist), British psychologist
- James N. Green, American professor and historian
- Judith Green (historian) (born 1947), English medieval historian
- Lucy Green (born 1957), British academic
- Martin Green (professor) (born 1948), Australian engineer and professor
- Michael Green (physicist) (born 1946), British physicist
- Peter Green (statistician) (born 1950), British statistician
- William H. Green (born 1963), American chemical engineer
