= Dibós =

Dibós is a surname. Notable people with the surname include:

- Denisse Dibós (born 1967), Peruvian actress
- Enrique Dibos (1932–2007), Peruvian sports shooter
