= Chalcone 4'-O-glucosyltransferase =

Class of enzymes

Identifiers
- EC no.: 2.4.1.286

Databases
- IntEnz: IntEnz view
- BRENDA: BRENDA entry
- ExPASy: NiceZyme view
- KEGG: KEGG entry
- MetaCyc: metabolic pathway
- PRIAM: profile
- PDB structures: RCSB PDB PDBe PDBsum
Search
- PMC: articles
- PubMed: articles
- NCBI: proteins

Chalcone 4'-O-glucosyltransferase (EC 2.4.1.286, 4'CGT) is an enzyme with systematic name UDP-alpha-D-glucose:2',4,4',6'-tetrahydroxychalcone 4'-O-beta-D-glucosyltransferase. This enzyme catalyses the following chemical reaction

(1) UDP-alpha-D-glucose + 2',4,4',6'-tetrahydroxychalcone $\rightleftharpoons$ UDP + 2',4,4',6'-tetrahydroxychalcone 4'-O-beta-D-glucoside
(2) UDP-alpha-D-glucose + 2',3,4,4',6'-pentahydroxychalcone $\rightleftharpoons$ UDP + 2',3,4,4',6'-pentahydroxychalcone 4'-O-beta-D-glucoside

This enzyme is isolated from the plant Antirrhinum majus (snapdragon).
