= David Greene =

David Greene may refer to:

- David Greene (American football) (born 1982), American football quarterback
- David Greene (director) (1921–2003), television director
- David Greene (footballer) (born 1973), soccer player
- David Greene (architect) (born 1937), English architect, lecturer and writer
- David H. Greene (1913–2008), author
- Dai Greene (David Greene, born 1986), Welsh hurdler
- David Greene (minister) (1797–1866), secretary of the American Board of Commissioners for Foreign Missions
- David Greene (journalist) (born 1976), former co-host of NPR's Morning Edition
- David Plunket Greene (1904–1941), one of the Bright Young Things who inspired the novel Vile Bodies by Evelyn Waugh
- David Greene (rugby league) (born 1964), Australian rugby league player
- David Greene (university administrator) (born 1963), American social planner, president of Colby College

== See also ==
- David Green (disambiguation)
