= Richard Trexler =

American historian

Richard Trexler (1932 – 8 March 2007) was a professor of history at Binghamton University, State University of New York. A specialist of the Renaissance, Reformation of Italy, and Behaviorist History, Trexler had over fifty published works. He was best known for revolutionizing the field of public life as historically significant. To celebrate his career and retirement, Binghamton University on April 14, 2004, had a symposium in his honor where renowned scholars in Early Modern Europe spoke on his behalf.

Trexler retired from the faculty of Binghamton University a year before his death. His final course was a history of Child Abuse in Europe and the United States, offered in the spring of 2006.

== Publications ==
- "Gender Subordination and Political Hierarchy in Pre-Hispanic America," in Infamous desire: Male homosexuality in colonial Latin America, ed, Pete Sigal (Chicago: University of Chicago Press, 2003).
- Reliving Golgotha: the passion play of Iztapalapa (Cambridge, MA: Harvard University Press, 2003).
- "Making the American Berdache: Choice or Constraint?" Journal of Social History 35 (2002).
- The Journey of the Magi. Meanings in History of a Christian Story (Princeton: Princeton University Press, 1997).
- Sex and Conquest: Gender Construction and Political Order at the Time of the European Conquest of the Americas (Polity Press and Cornell University Press, 1995).
- Gender rhetorics : postures of dominance and submission in history (Binghamton, N.Y. : Medieval & Renaissance Texts & Studies, 1994).
- Dependence in Context In Renaissance Florence (Binghamton, NY: Medieval & Renaissance Texts & Studies, 1994).
- Power & Dependence in Renaissance Florence, vol. I (The Women...), II (The Children...), III (The Workers of Renaissance Florence) (Binghamton: MRTS, 1993).
- Naked Before the Father. The Renunciation of Francis of Assisi (Peter Lang, 1989).
- Church and community 1200-1600 : studies in the history of Florence and New Spain (Roma : Edizioni di storia e letteratura, 1987).
- "Historiography Sacred or Profane? Reverence and Profanity in the Study of Early Modern Religion," in Religion and Society in Early Modern Europe, 1500–1800, ed. K. von Greyerz (London, 1984), 243–269.
- "Correre la terra. Collective insults in the late Middle Ages," Mélanges de l'École française de Rome: Moyen âge - Temps modernes, 96 (1984).
- Public Life in Renaissance Florence, Studies in Social Discontinuity (Academic Press, 1980. Reprinted: Cornell University Press, 1991).
- "Lorenzo de' Medici and Savonarola, Martyrs for Florence," Renaissance quarterly, 31 (1978)
- "Measures against Water Pollution in Fifteenth-Century Florence," Viator 5 (1974).
- The spiritual power: Republican Florence under interdict (Leiden: Brill, 1974).
- Synodal law in Florence and Fiesole, 1306-1518 (Citta del Vaticano : Biblioteca apostolica vaticana, 1971).
- "Rome On The Eve Of The Great Schism," Speculum 42 (1967).

See also:

- Power, Gender, and Ritual in Europe and the Americas: Essays in Memory of Richard C. Trexler, ed. Peter Arnade and Michael Rocke (Toronto: Centre for Reformation and Renaissance Studies, 2008).
