= David S. Green =

American politician and minister

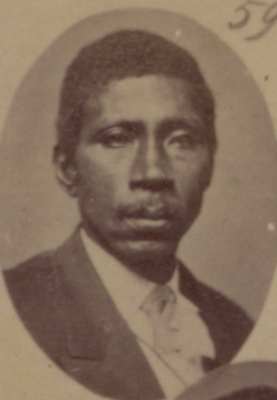

Member of the Mississippi House of Representatives
- In office 1872–1875

Personal details
- Born: South Carolina, U.S.
- Spouse: Lucy
- Profession: Politician, minister

David S. Green was a minister and state legislator in Mississippi.

He represented Grenada County in the Mississippi House of Representatives from 1872 to 1875. He was a minister in the Methodist Episcopal church. In 1912, the Mississippi Historical Society described him as a "very black, common, old Negro."

== See also ==
- African American officeholders from the end of the Civil War until before 1900
