= Jerry Girard =

American television journalist

- Born: Gerard Alfred Suglia; August 6, 1932; Chicago, Illinois, U.S.
- Died: March 25, 2007 (aged 74); Hawthorne, New York, U.S.
- Education: Manhattan College
- Occupation: Television sportscaster

Jerry Girard (August 6, 1932 – March 25, 2007) was an American radio personality and sports anchor, most notably at WPIX in New York City.

== Early life and career ==
Born as Gerard Alfred Suglia in Chicago and raised in The Bronx, New York, where he attended Manhattan College, Jerry Girard went on to work as a radio disc jockey in places like Myrtle Beach, South Carolina, Altoona, Pennsylvania and Gary, Indiana, before returning to New York to work as a record librarian at WNEW (AM).

He first joined WPIX in 1967 as a news writer, and in 1974 replaced Don Ellison as sports anchor. He had a dry sense of humor and a style that treated his viewers like they were intelligent sports fans. He often gave horse racing results at the end of his segments. He also distinguished himself among sportscasters by eschewing the usual practice of showing highlights of sports games, instead opting to show key plays that would lend themselves to his particular takes on the games in question.

His run with WPIX ended in 1995 when he resigned rather than accept a demotion after 21 years as the sports anchor. He was replaced by Sal Marchiano ().

== Death ==
Girard died in Hawthorne, New York, aged 74, after a year-long battle with esophageal cancer.
