= Anton Biersack (ice hockey) =

German ice hockey player (1927–2007)

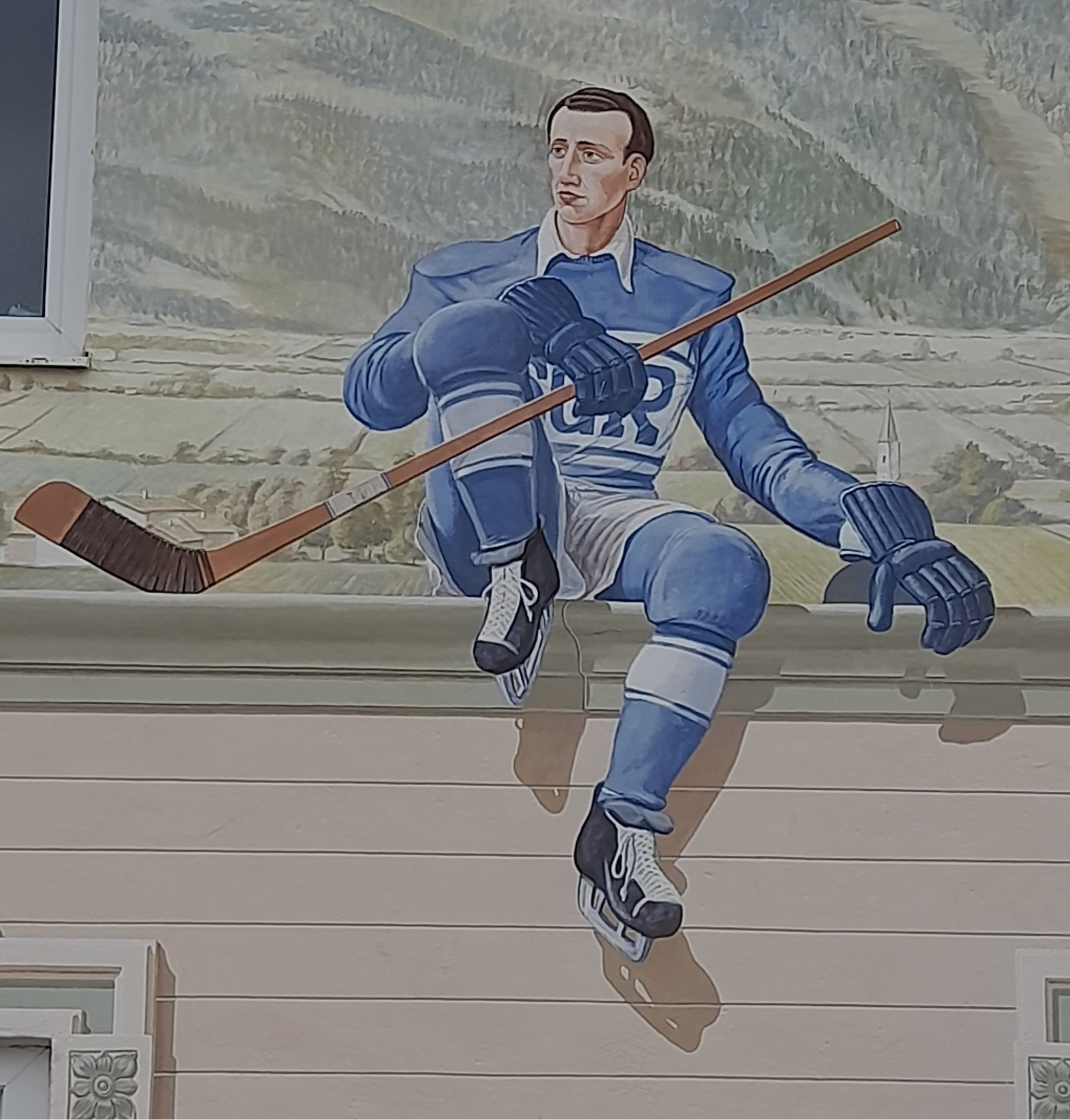

Personal information
- Nationality: German
- Born: 14 July 1927; Garmisch-Partenkirchen, Germany
- Died: 30 March 2007 (aged 79); Munich, Germany

Sport
- Sport: Ice hockey

Anton Biersack (14 July 1927 – 30 March 2007) was a German ice hockey player. He competed in the men's tournament at the 1956 Winter Olympics.
