= Dora Jelínková =

Czech volleyball player (1949–2007)

Personal information
- Nationality: Czech
- Born: 5 August 1949 Brno, Czechoslovakia
- Died: 20 March 2007 (aged 57) Brno, Czech Republic

Sport
- Sport: Volleyball

Dora Jelínková (5 August 1949 – 20 March 2007) was a Czech volleyball player. She competed in the women's tournament at the 1972 Summer Olympics.
