= David W. Green (psychologist) =

Cognitive scientist

David Green is a professorial research fellow in the Department of Cognitive, Perceptual & Brain Sciences, an honorary senior research associate, an emeritus professor of psychology in the Division of Psychology & Language Sciences, and on the faculty of Brain Sciences at University College London. He has researched widely on subjects such as mental models, both construction and manipulation, the lexical organisation, and modelling control processes in speech production, language control particularly biliginual and the imaging of language and object recognition in the neurologically damaged. He is one of the four chief editors of the academic journal Bilingualism: Language and Cognition.
