= Oriol de Bolòs =

Spanish (Catalan) botanist (1924–2007)

- Born: 16 March 1924; Olot, Girona
- Died: 22 March 2007 (aged 83); Barcelona
- Scientific career
- Fields: phytogeography, pteridology
- Author abbrev. (botany): O.Bolòs

Oriol de Bolòs i Capdevila (born 16 March 1924 in Olot; died 22 March 2007 in Barcelona) was a Spanish botanist, pteridologist, and phytosociologist. He was a specialist in the flora of Catalonia and Spain, and also of the Mediterranean regions, the North Atlantic islands of (Macaronesia) and also Brazil.

== Background ==
Bolòs came from a family of pharmacists and botanists. Having completed his doctorate in biological sciences, at the Complutense University of Madrid, from 1953 he became professor at the University of Barcelona and from 1965 to 1984 was the director of the Botanical Institute of Barcelona. Joining the Biological Sciences section of the Institute of Catalan Studies in 1964, Bolòs would chair the section between 1989 and 1992.

Influenced by Pius Font i Quer and by the founder of the phytosociology Josias Braun-Blanquet, Bolòs would publish Les groupements végétaux moyen du bassin de l'Ebre et leur dynamisme with Braun-Blanquet in (1958). As a flora writer his main work was the Flora dels Països Catalans (Flora of Catalonia, Valencia, and the Balearic Islands) (1984-2001), which was an effort to track comprehensively all that was known to then, the publishing was edited jointly with Josep Vigo Bonada. Published work by Bolòs include more than 200 titles of books, articles and contributions to other works.

== Noted works ==
As a disciple of Font i Quer as he paid great attention to questions of botanical nomenclature. Bolòs was also active throughout his life in the defense of the protection of the environment and the interests of future generations.

He was the author or co-author of the formal names of a number of phytosociological communities, together with those which appear with the official abbreviation O.Bolòs.

== Some publications ==
=== Books ===
- 1950. La cartografía de la vegetación en los Pirineos. Volumen 27 de Monografías del Instituto de Estudios Pirenaicos. 17 pp.
- 1958. Oriol de Bolòs i Capdevila, René Molinier. Recherches phytosociologiques dans l'île de Majorque. Collectanea Botanica. Vol. 5, Nº 34, Fasc. 3, pp. 699-865 (167 pp.). Ed. Instituto Botánico de Barcelona.
- 1967. Comunidades vegetales de las comarcas proximas al litoral situadas entre los rios Llobregat y Segura. Volumen 3; Volumen 31; Volumen 38 de Memorias de la Real Academia de Ciencias y Artes de Barcelona. Ed. Ariel. 280 pp.
- 1970. Observations phytosociologiques dans l'île de Minorque. Volumen 5 de Acta geobotanica Barcinonensia, con René Molinier y Pedro Montserrat Recoder. 150 pp.
- 1987. Las comunidades vegetales de la depresión del Ebro y su dinamismo, con J. Braun-Blanquet. 278 pp. Ayuntamiento de Zaragoza.
- 1984. Oriol de Bolòs, Josep Vigo. Flora dels Països Catalans. Four volumes. Ed. Barcino.

== Honours ==
He was a Member of the Catalan Institute of Natural History, of the Academy of Sciences and Arts of Barcelona and the International Phytosociological Commission.

He received honours from the Government of Catalonia, such as the Narcís Monturiol medal for services to science and technology, and the Creu de Sant Jordi, the highest honour that can be granted by the Catalan government.
