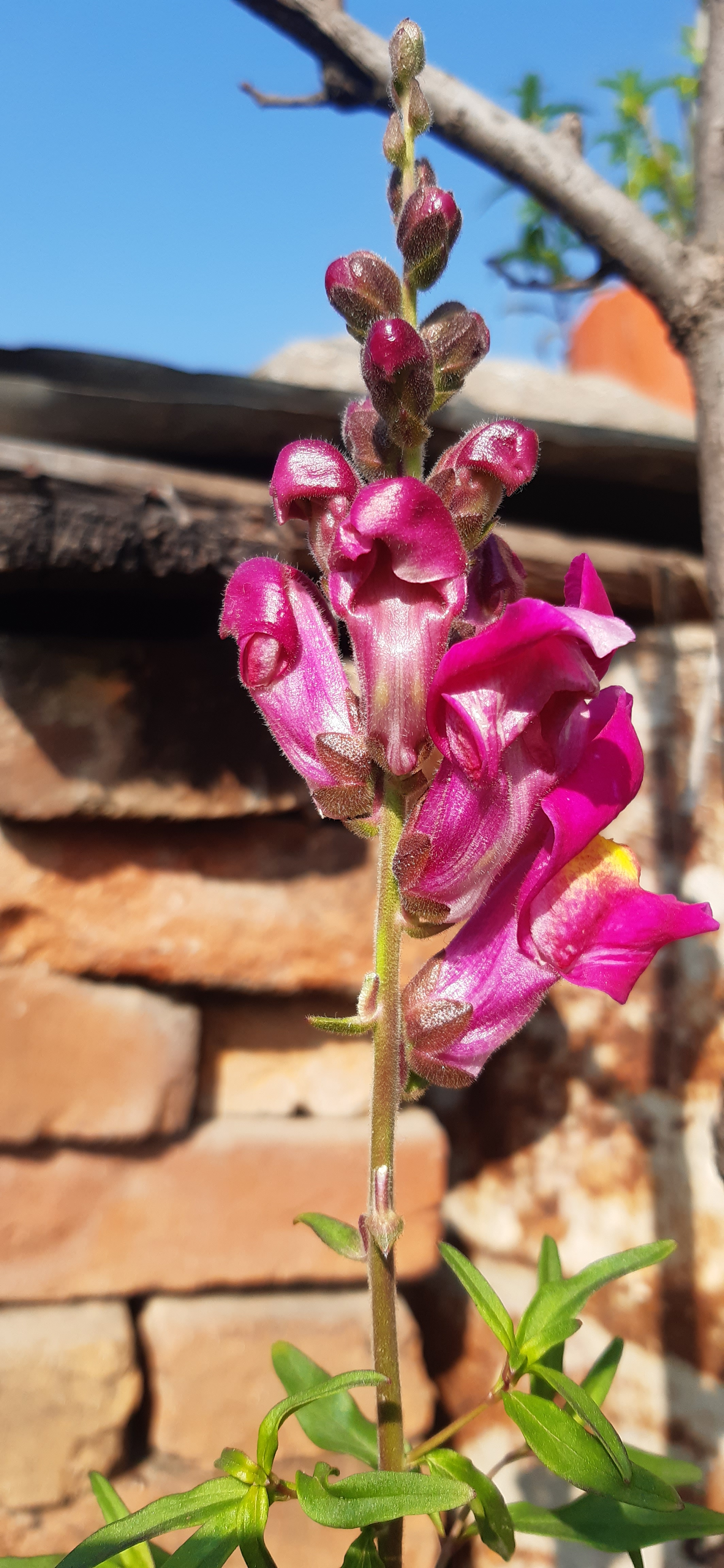

Scientific classification
- Kingdom: Plantae
- Clade: Tracheophytes
- Clade: Angiosperms
- Clade: Eudicots
- Clade: Asterids
- Order: Lamiales
- Family: Plantaginaceae
- Genus: Antirrhinum
- Species: A. tortuosum

Binomial name
- Antirrhinum tortuosum Bosc ex Vent.

Synonyms
- List: Antirrhinum capitatum C.Presl; Antirrhinum compositum Lojac.; Antirrhinum diminutum Pomel; Antirrhinum fernandezcasasii Romo, Stübing & Peris; Antirrhinum gebelicum Brullo & Furnari; Antirrhinum italicum Mill.; Antirrhinum lazari Sennen; Antirrhinum leiocalyx Pau; Antirrhinum montevidense Mart. ex Colla; Antirrhinum ottomanum Janka; Antirrhinum rhodium Boiss. ex Benth.; Antirrhinum romanum Sebast. & Mauri ex Nyman; Antirrhinum ternatum Fern.Casas; Antirrhinum vidalianum Pau & Font Quer

= Antirrhinum tortuosum =

Species of plant

Antirrhinum tortuosum is a species of plant in the family Plantaginaceae. It is a herbaceous, perennial plant found naturally in the Western Mediterranean.

== Description ==
These plants herbaceous with purple flowers, 30–35 mm in diameter, and grow on a raceme. The plant flowers from spring through fall. and is perennial.

== Habitat ==
This plant is mostly found growing out of limestone rockfaces, walls, or on roadsides. Populations often exist over small ranges.

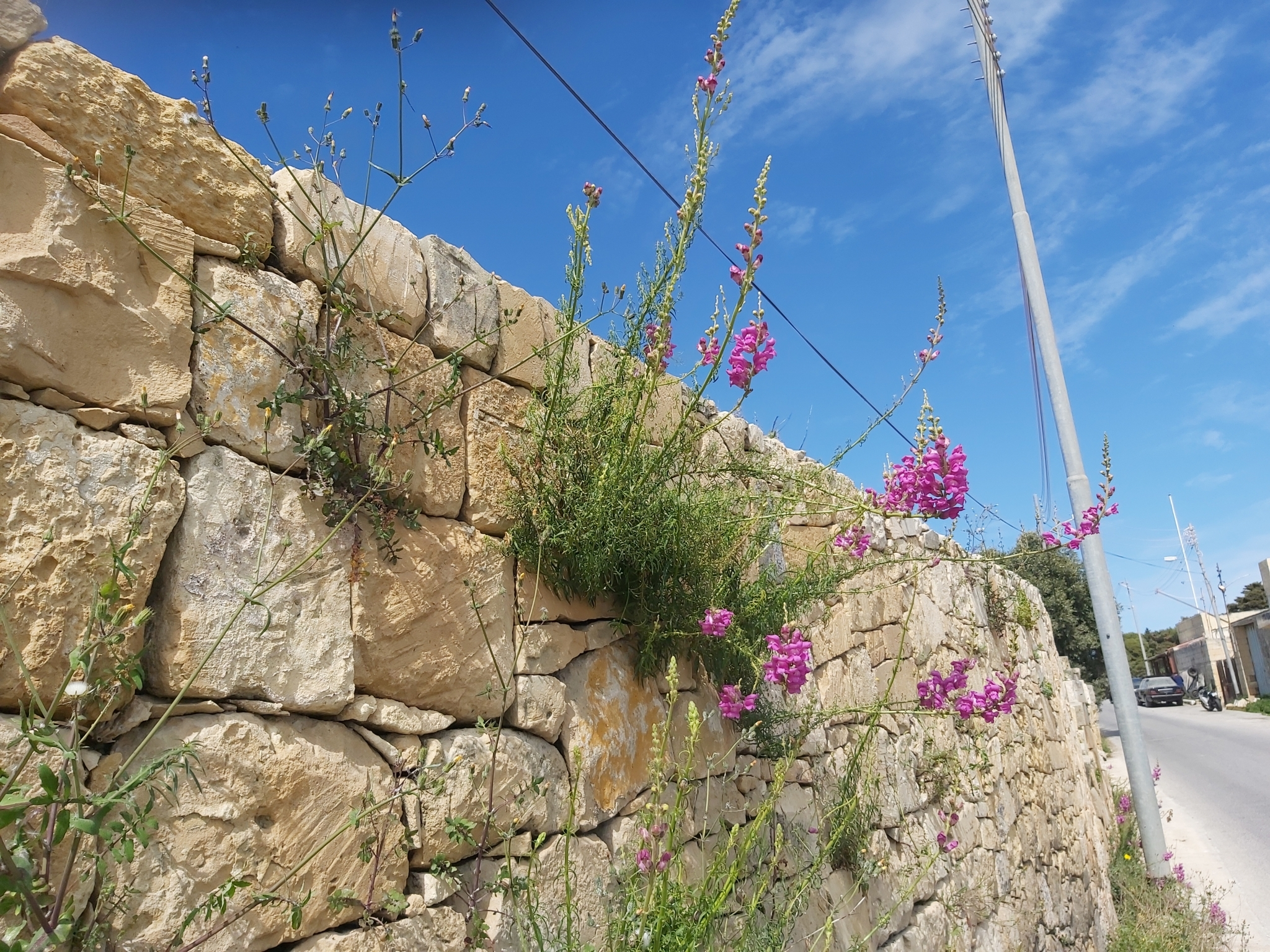
Growing out of a stone wall in Dingli, Malta

== Location ==
Antirrhinum tortuosum is more widespread than other members of Antirrhinum, found throughout the Western Mediterranean, significantly in Italy as well as the Iberian Peninsula.

== Reproduction ==
It is a predominantly bee pollinated species with flowers forming a dense raceme. It is a fruit bearing species, and displays temperature-sensitive pollen germination. This species is also self incompatible.
