= David Green (political adviser) =

David Green was a key adviser to Illinois Governor Dan Walker. He was also known as a successful businessman and philanthropist.

Green grew up on the West and South Sides of Chicago. After graduating from Hyde Park High School, Green went to the University of Chicago for college. He returned to the school for a master's degree in social science after serving with the Army Signal Corps in the South Pacific during World War II.

A long-time resident of Chicago's Hyde Park neighborhood, Green became active in 5th Ward politics and the Democratic Federation of Illinois. He participated in the 1960 presidential campaign of John F. Kennedy and was a special adviser to Kennedy on the Trade Expansion Act of 1962.

Green died March 26, 2007.

== Sources ==
- "David Green: 1922-2007; Key adviser to Dan Walker" Chicago Tribune, Mar 31, 2007.
