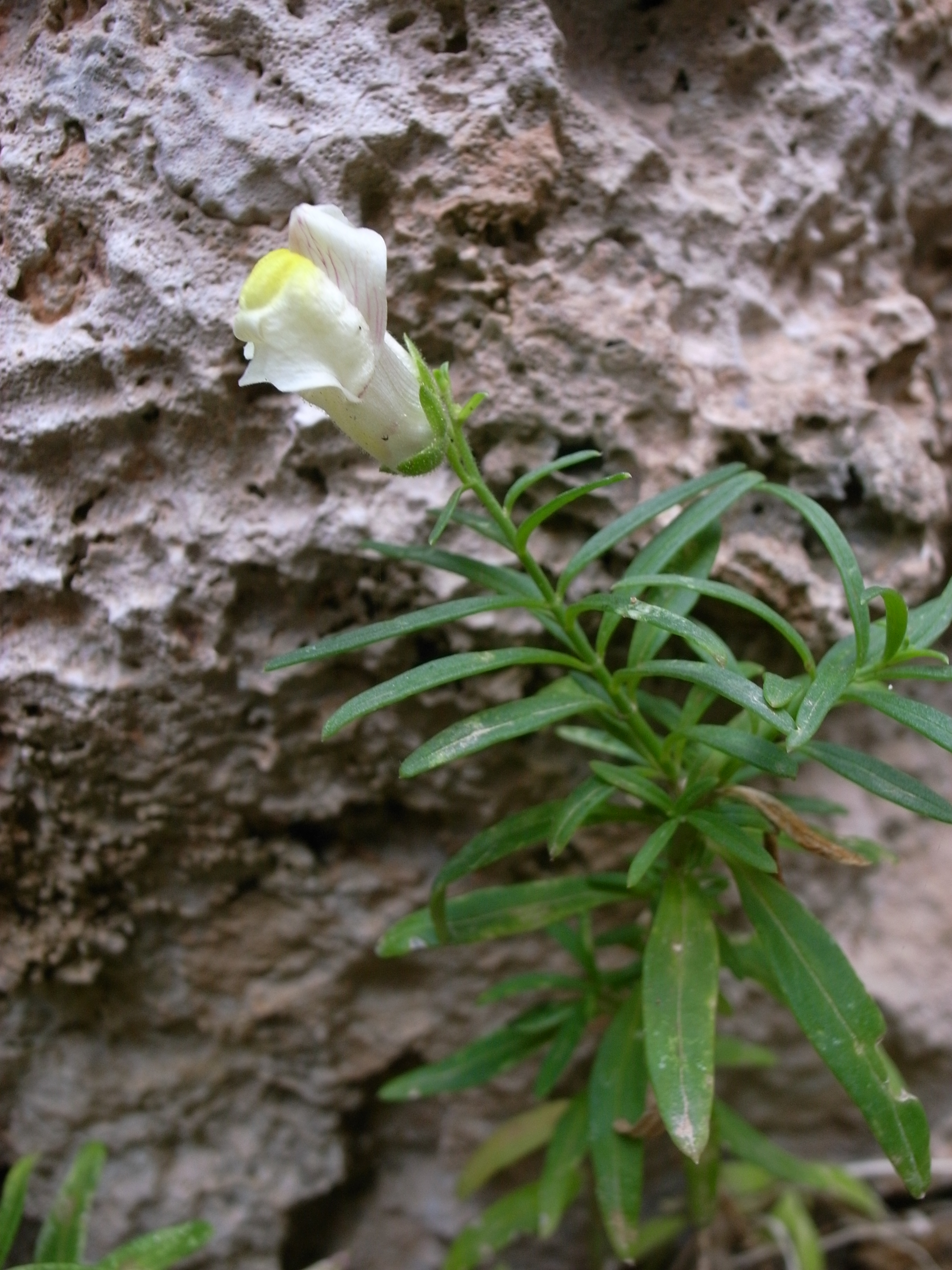

Scientific classification
- Kingdom: Plantae
- Clade: Tracheophytes
- Clade: Angiosperms
- Clade: Eudicots
- Clade: Asterids
- Order: Lamiales
- Family: Plantaginaceae
- Genus: Antirrhinum
- Species: A. siculum

Binomial name
- Antirrhinum siculum Mill.

Synonyms
- Antirrhinum majus subsp. siculum

= Antirrhinum siculum =

Species of plant

Antirrhinum siculum is a species of herb in the family Plantaginaceae. It have simple, narrow leaves. Individuals can grow to 40 cm.

== Sources ==
This article incorporates text from a free content work. Licensed under CC0 (license statement/permission). Text taken from Antirrhinum siculum. Encyclopedia of Life.
