= Enrique Dibos =

Peruvian sports shooter

Personal information
- Born: 25 September 1932 Talara, Peru
- Died: 28 March 2007 (aged 74)

Sport
- Sport: Sports shooting

Enrique Dibos (25 September 1932 – 28 March 2007) was a Peruvian sports shooter. He competed at the 1960 Summer Olympics and the 1964 Summer Olympics.
