= Albrecht von Haller =

Swiss anatomist, physiologist, naturalist and poet (1708–1777)

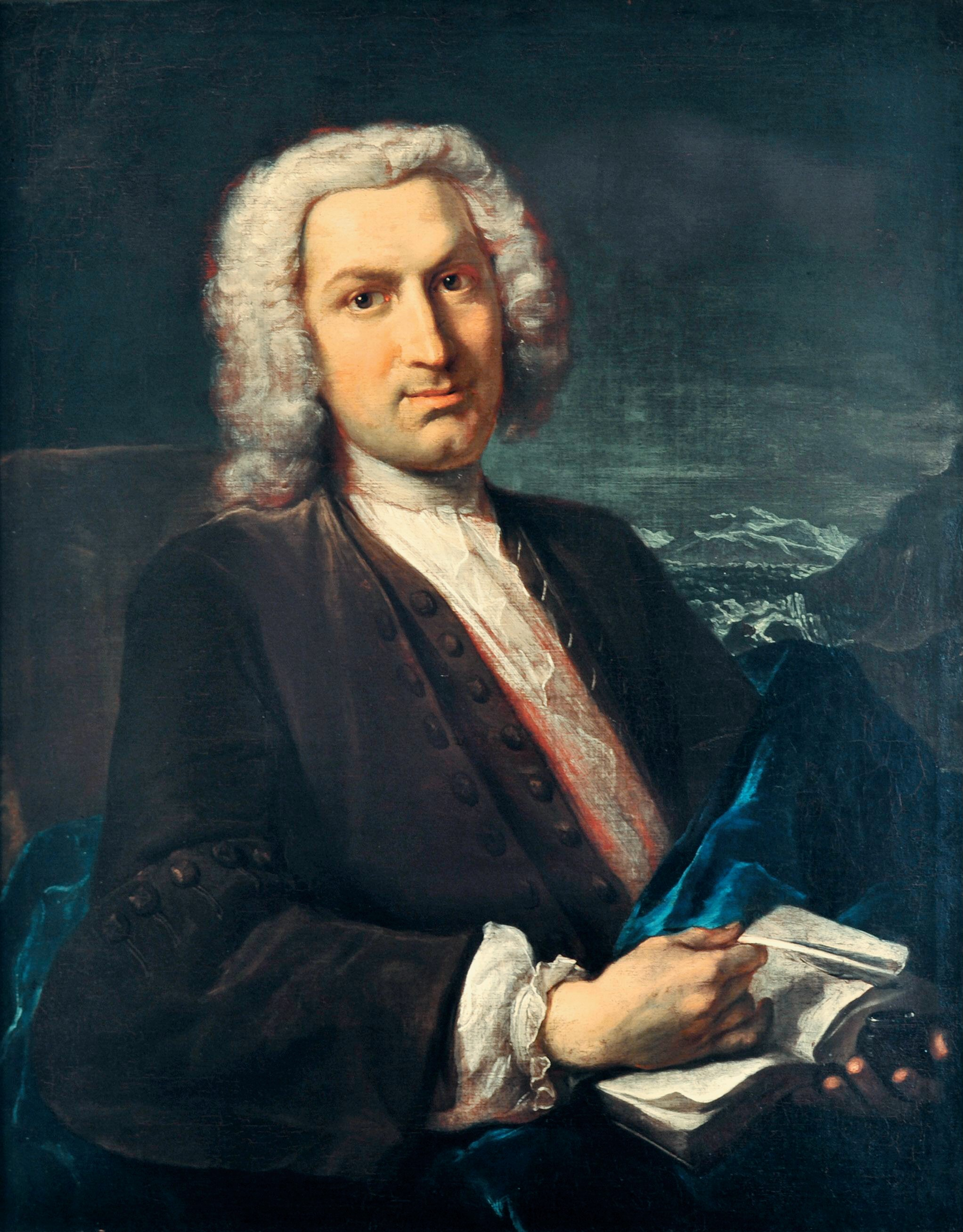
- Portrait by Johann Rudolf Huber, 1736
- Born: 16 October 1708; Bern, Swiss Confederacy
- Died: 12 December 1777 (aged 69); Bern, Swiss Confederacy
- Scientific career
- Fields: Anatomy; physiology; natural history

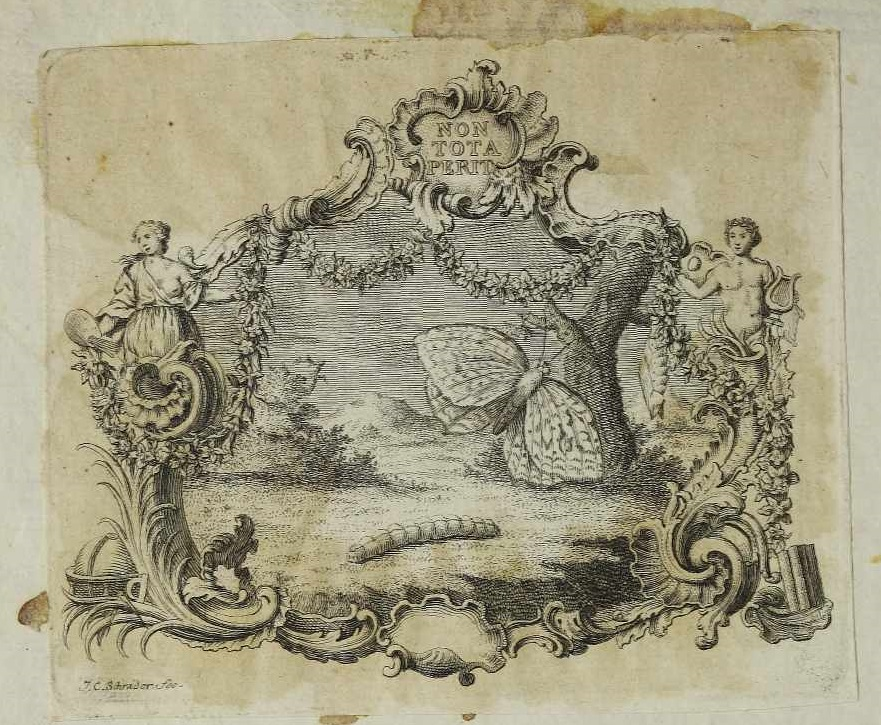
Ex libris from Albrecht von Haller. Da Fondazione BEIC

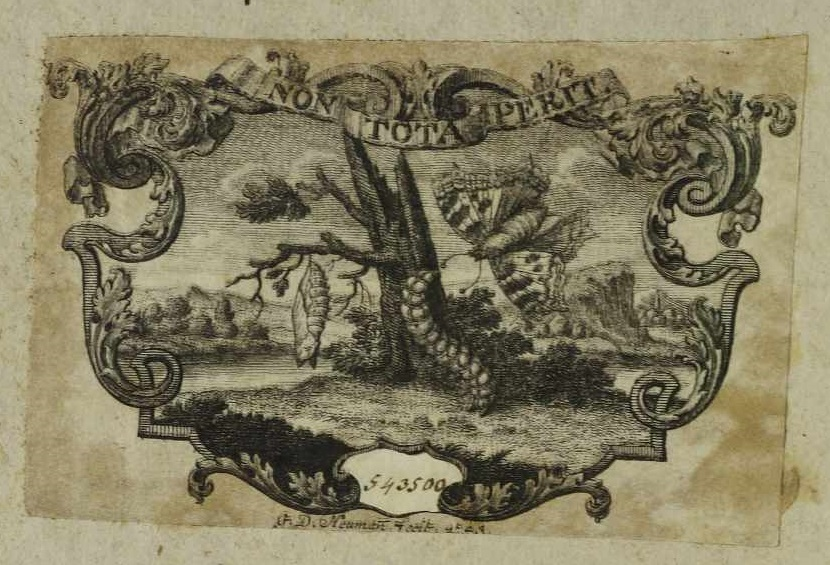
Ex libris from Albrecht von Haller. Da Fondazione BEIC

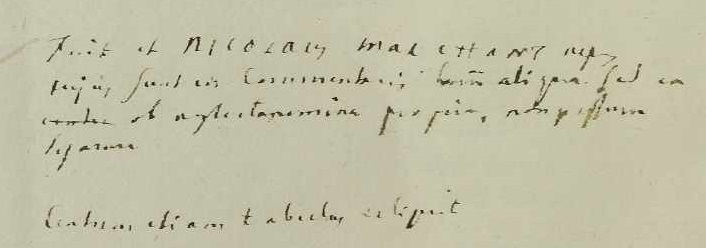
Manuscript notes from Albrecht von Haller. Da Fondazione BEIC

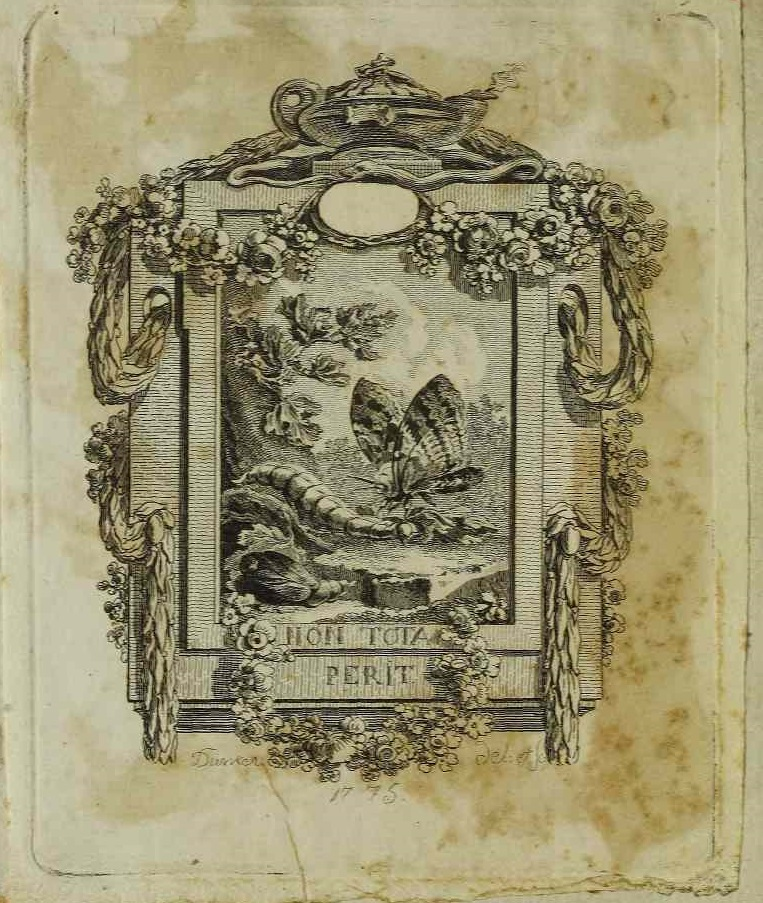
Copper engraving ex libris from Albrecht von Haller. Fondazione BEIC

Albrecht von Haller (also known as Albertus de Haller; 16 October 1708 – 12 December 1777) was a Swiss anatomist, physiologist, naturalist, encyclopedist, bibliographer and poet. A pupil of Herman Boerhaave and Jacob Winslow, he is sometimes referred to as "the father of modern physiology."

== Early life ==
Haller was born into an old Swiss family at Bern. Prevented by long-continued ill-health from taking part in boyish sports, he had more opportunity for the development of his precocious mind. At the age of four, it is said, he used to read and expound the Bible to his father's servants; before he was ten he had sketched a Biblical Aramaic grammar, prepared a Greek and a Hebrew vocabulary, compiled a collection of two thousand biographies of famous men and women on the model of the great works of Bayle and Moréri, and written in Latin verse a satire on his tutor, who had warned him against a too great excursiveness. When still hardly fifteen he was already the author of numerous metrical translations from Ovid, Horace and Virgil, as well as of original lyrics, dramas, and an epic of four thousand lines on the origin of the Swiss confederations, writings which he is said on one occasion to have rescued from a fire at the risk of his life, only, however, to burn them a little later (1729) with his own hand.

== Medicine ==
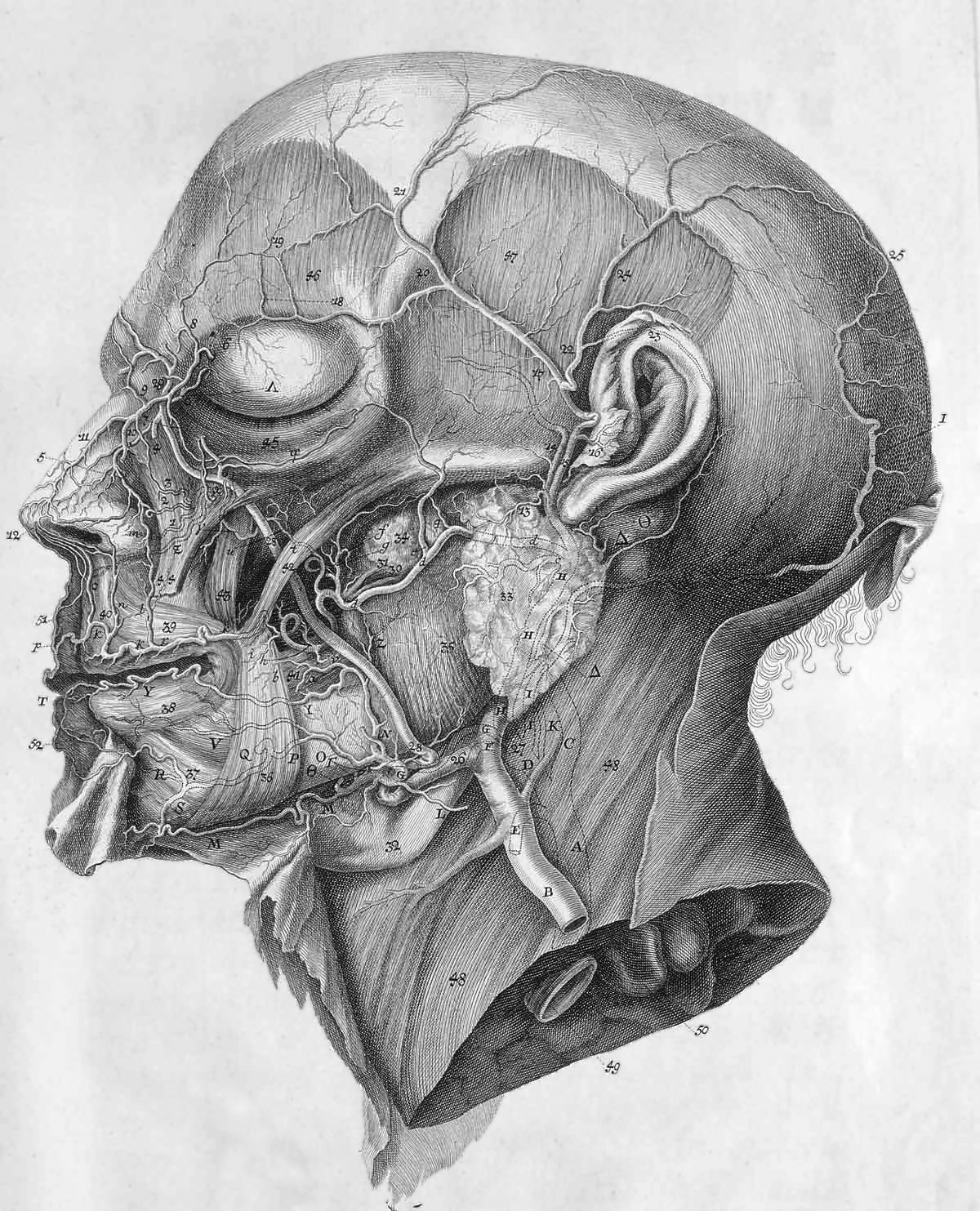
Illustration from C.J. Rollinus in Haller's book Icones anatomicae from 1756

Haller's attention had been directed to the profession of medicine while he was residing in the house of a physician at Biel after his father's death in 1721. He went in his sixteenth year to the University of Tübingen as of December 1723, where he studied under Elias Rudolph Camerarius Jr. and Johann Duvernoy. Satisfied with his progress, he in 1725 left Tübingen for the University of Leiden, where Herman Boerhaave was in the zenith of his fame, and where Bernhard Siegfried Albinus had already begun to lecture in anatomy. At that university he graduated in May 1727, undertaking successfully in his thesis to prove that the so-called salivary duct, claimed as a recent discovery by Georg Daniel Coschwitz (1679-1729), was nothing more than a blood-vessel.

=== "Sensibility" and "irritability" ===
In 1752, at the University of Göttingen, Haller published his thesis (De partibus corporis humani sensibilibus et irritabilibus) discussing the distinction between "sensibility" and "irritability" in organs, suggesting that nerves were "sensible" because of a person's ability to perceive contact while muscles were "irritable" because the fiber could measurably shorten on its own, regardless of a person's perception, when excited by a foreign body.

=== "Nerve impulses" vs. "muscular contractions" ===
Later in 1757, he conducted a famous series of experiments to distinguish between nerve impulses and muscular contractions.

== Other disciplines ==
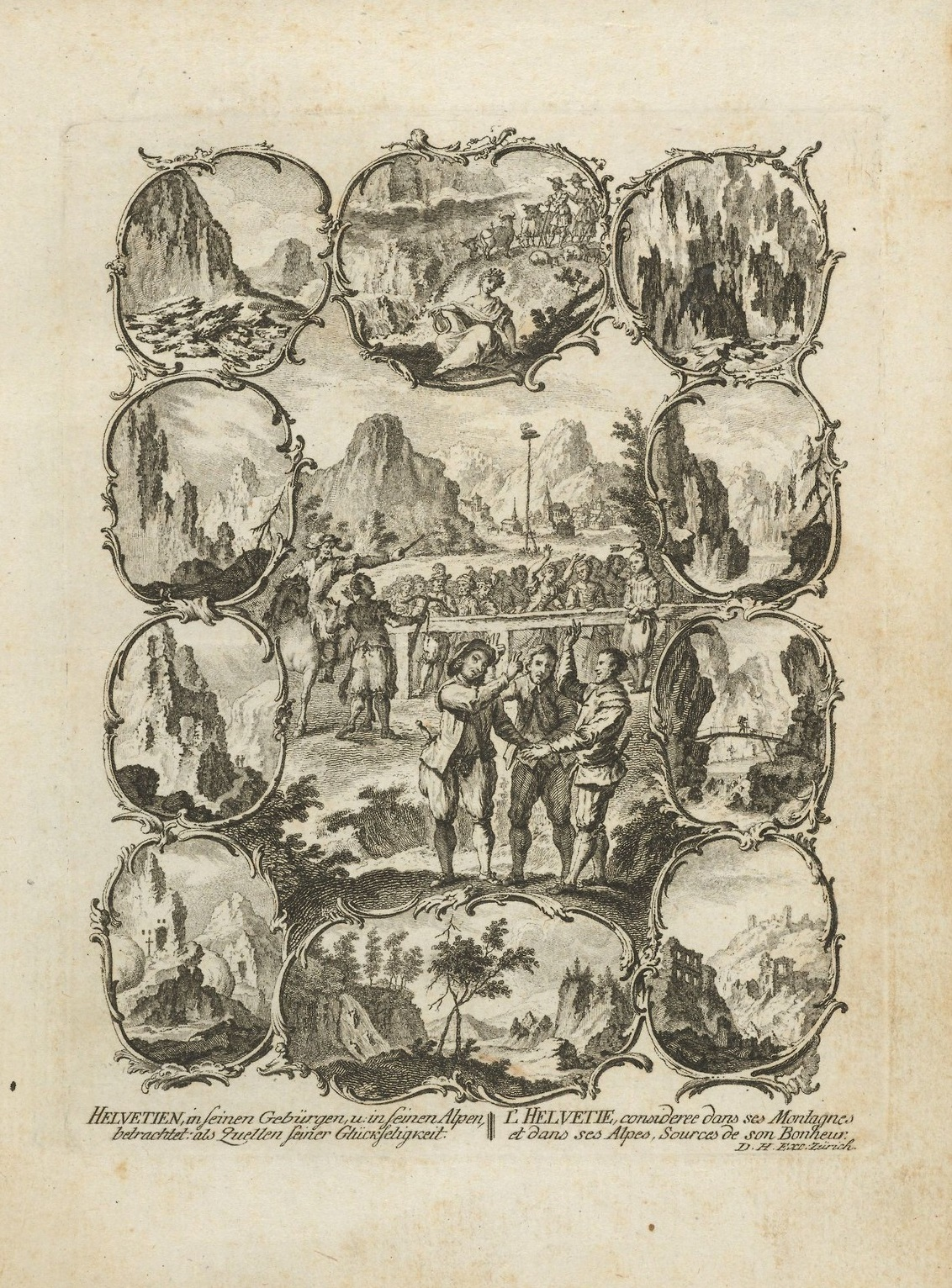
Frontispiece to Ode sur les Alpes, 1773

Haller then visited London, making the acquaintance of Sir Hans Sloane, William Cheselden, John Pringle, James Douglas and other scientific men; next, after a short stay in Oxford, he visited Paris, where he studied under Henri François Le Dran and Jacob Winslow; and in 1728 he proceeded to Basel, where he devoted himself to the study of higher mathematics under John Bernoulli. It was during his stay there also that his interest in botany was awakened; and, in the course of a tour (July/August, 1728), through Savoy, Baden and several of the cantons of Switzerland, he began a collection of plants which was afterwards the basis of his great work on the flora of Switzerland. From a literary point of view the main result of this, the first of his many journeys through the Alps, was his poem entitled Die Alpen, which was finished in March 1729, and appeared in the first edition (1732) of his Gedichte. This poem of 490 hexameters is historically important as one of the earliest signs of the awakening appreciation of the mountains, though it is chiefly designed to contrast the simple and idyllic life of the inhabitants of the Alps with the corrupt and decadent existence of the dwellers in the plains.

In 1729 he returned to Bern and began to practice as a physician; his best energies, however, were devoted to the botanical and anatomical researches which rapidly gave him a European reputation, and procured for him from George II in 1736 a call to the chair of medicine, anatomy, botany and surgery in the newly founded University of Göttingen. He became a Fellow of the Royal Society in 1743, a foreign member of the Royal Swedish Academy of Sciences in 1747, and was ennobled in 1749.

The quantity of work achieved by Haller in the seventeen years during which he occupied his Göttingen professorship was immense. Apart from the ordinary work of his classes, which entailed the task of newly organizing a botanical garden (now the Old Botanical Garden of Göttingen University), an anatomical theatre and museum, an obstetrical school, and similar institutions, he carried on without interruption original investigations in botany and physiology, the results of which are preserved in the numerous works associated with his name. He also continued to persevere in his youthful habit of poetical composition, while at the same time he conducted a monthly journal (the Göttingische gelehrte Anzeigen), to which he is said to have contributed twelve thousand articles relating to almost every branch of human knowledge. He also warmly interested himself in most of the religious questions, both ephemeral and permanent, of his day; and the erection of the Reformed church in Göttingen was mainly due to his unwearied energy. Like his mentor Boerhaave, Haller was a Christian and a collection of his religious thoughts can be read in a compilation of letters to his daughter.

Notwithstanding all this variety of absorbing interests, Haller never felt at home in Göttingen; his untravelled heart kept on turning towards his native Bern, where he had been elected a member of the great council in 1745, and in 1753 he resolved to resign his chair and return to Switzerland.

== Botany ==
Haller made important contributions to botanical taxonomy that are less visible today because he resisted binomial nomenclature, Carl Linnaeus's innovative shorthand for species names that was introduced in 1753 and marks the starting point for botanical nomenclature as accepted today.

Haller was among the first botanists to realize the importance of herbaria to study variation in plants, and he therefore purposely included material from different localities, habitats and developmental phases. Haller also grew many plants from the Alps himself.

The plant genus Halleria, an attractive shrub from Southern Africa, was named in his honour by Carl Linnaeus.

== Later life ==
The twenty-one years of his life which followed were largely occupied in the discharge of his duties in the minor political post of a Rathausmann which he had obtained by lot, and in the preparation of his Bibliotheca medica, the botanical, surgical and anatomical parts of which he lived to complete; but he also found time to write the three philosophical romances Usong (1771), Alfred (1773) and Fabius and Cato (1774), in which his views as to the respective merits of despotism, of limited monarchy and of aristocratic republican government are fully set forth.

In about 1773, his poor health forced him to withdraw from public business. He supported his failing strength by means of opium, on the use of which he communicated a paper to the Proceedings of the Göttingen Royal Society in 1776; the excessive use of the drug is believed, however, to have hastened his death.

Haller, who had been three times married, left eight children. The eldest, Gottlieb Emanuel, attained to some distinction as a botanist and as a writer on Swiss historical bibliography (1785–1788, 7 vols). Another son, Albrecht was also a botanist.

See also:

- History of anatomy in the 17th and 18th centuries

== Importance for homoeopathy ==
Albrecht von Haller is quoted in the footnote to paragraph 108 in the Organon of Medicine, the principal work by the founder of homoeopathy, Samuel Hahnemann. In this paragraph, Hahnemann describes how the curative powers of individual medicines can only be ascertained through accurate observation of their specific effects on healthy persons:

"Not one single physician, as far as I know, during the previous two thousand five hundred years, thought of this so natural, so absolutely necessary and only genuine mode of testing medicines for their pure and peculiar effects in deranging the health of man, in order to learn what morbid state each medicine is capable of curing, except the great and immortal Albrecht von Haller. He alone, besides myself, saw the necessity of this (vide the Preface to the Pharmacopoeia Helvet., Basil, 1771, fol., p. 12); Nempe primum in corpore sano medela tentanda est, sine peregrina ulla miscela; odoreque et sapore ejus exploratis, exigua illiu dosis ingerenda et ad ommes, quae inde contingunt, affectiones, quis pulsus, qui calor, quae respiratia, quaenam excretiones, attendum. Inde ad ductum phaenomenorum, in sano obviorum, transeas ad experimenta in corpore aegroro," etc. But no one, not a single physician, attended to or followed up this invaluable hint."

The quotation from Haller's Preface may be translated from the Latin as follows: "Of course, firstly the remedy must be proved on a healthy body, without being mixed with anything foreign; and when its odour and flavour have been ascertained, a tiny dose of it should be given and attention paid to all the changes of state that take place, what the pulse is, what heat there is, what sort of breathing and what exertions there are. Then in relation to the form of the phenomena in a healthy person from those exposed to it, you should move on to trials on a sick body..."

== Reception ==
In his Science of Logic, Hegel mentions Haller's description of eternity, called by Kant "terrifying" in the Critique of Pure Reason (A613/B641). According to Hegel, Haller realizes that a conception of eternity as infinite progress is "futile and empty". In a way, Hegel uses Haller's description of eternity as a foreshadowing of his own conception of the true infinite. Hegel claims that Haller is aware that: "only by giving up this empty, infinite progression can the genuine infinite itself become present to him."

== Works ==
- Dr. Albrecht Hallers Versuch von schweizerischen Gedichten. Bern: bey Niclaus Emanuel Haller. 1734.
- Scriptores rei rusticae veteres latini (in Latin). Vol. 1. Leipzig: Kaspar Fritsch. 1735.
  - Scriptores rei rusticae veteres latini (in Latin). Vol. 2. Leipzig: Kaspar Fritsch. 1735.
- Enumeratio methodica stirpium Helvetiae indigenarum (in Latin). Vol. 2. Göttingen: Abraham Vandenhoeck. 1742.
- De allii genere naturali (in Latin). Göttingen: Abraham Vandenhoeck. 1745.
- Onomatologia medica completa. Gaum, Ulm 1755 Digital edition of the University and State Library Düsseldorf
- Sull'insensibilità e irritabilità di alcune parti degli animali (in Italian). Roma: Giovanni Zempel. 1755.
- Deux Memoires sur le mouvement du sang et sur les effets de la saignée: fondés sur des experiences faites sur des animaux 1756
- Sitologia (in Italian). Vol. 1. Livorno: Marco Coltellini. 1765.
  - Sitologia (in Italian). Vol. 2. Livorno: Marco Coltellini. 1765.
- Historia stirpium indigenarum Helvetiae inchoata. Bernae, 1768. Vol. 1&2 Digital edition of the University and State Library Düsseldorf.
- Memorie sopra i muli (in Italian). Modena: Giovanni Montanari. 1768.
- Nomenclator ex historia plantarum indigenarum helvetiae (in Latin). Bern: Societas Typographica. 1769.
- Essais d'expériences physiques de l'Académie del Cimento (in French). Paris: Hotel de Thou. 1770.
- Bibliotheca botanica (in Latin). Vol. 1. Zürich: Orell & Gessner & Füssli & C. 1771.
  - Bibliotheca botanica (in Latin). Vol. 2. Zürich: Orell & Gessner & Füssli & C. 1772.
- Ode sur les Alpes, 1773
- Materia medica oder Geschichte der Arzneyen des Pflanzenreichs. Vol. 1&2. Leipzig: Haug, 1782. Digital edition of the University and State Library Düsseldorf.
- Histoire des Plantes suisses ou Matiere médicale et de l'Usage économique des Plantes par M. Alb. de Haller ... Traduit du Latin. Vol. 1&2. Berne 1791 Digital edition of the University and State Library Düsseldorf.
- Briefe über die wichtigsten Wahrheiten der Offenbarung. Zum Druke befördert durch den Herausgeber der Geschichte Usongs. Bernae: in Verlag der neuen Buchhandlung. 1772.
- Elementa physiologiae corporis humani. Vol. 10. Fetus, vita, mors. Venetiis: apud Aloysium Milocco in via Mercatoria, sub signo Apollinis. 1775.
- Elementa physiologiae corporis humani. Vol. 8. Chylus, urina, semen. Venetiis: apud Aloysium Milocco in via Mercatoria, sub signo Apollinis. 1775.
- Elementa physiologiae corporis humani. Vol. 1. Fibra, vasa, circuitus sanguinis, cor. Venetiis: apud Aloysium Milocco in via Mercatoria, sub signo Apollinis. 1766.

== See also ==
- Hallerian physiology, the theory named after Albrecht von Haller, as an alternative explanation to Galvanism
- Karl Ludwig von Haller, Haller's grandson

== Sources ==
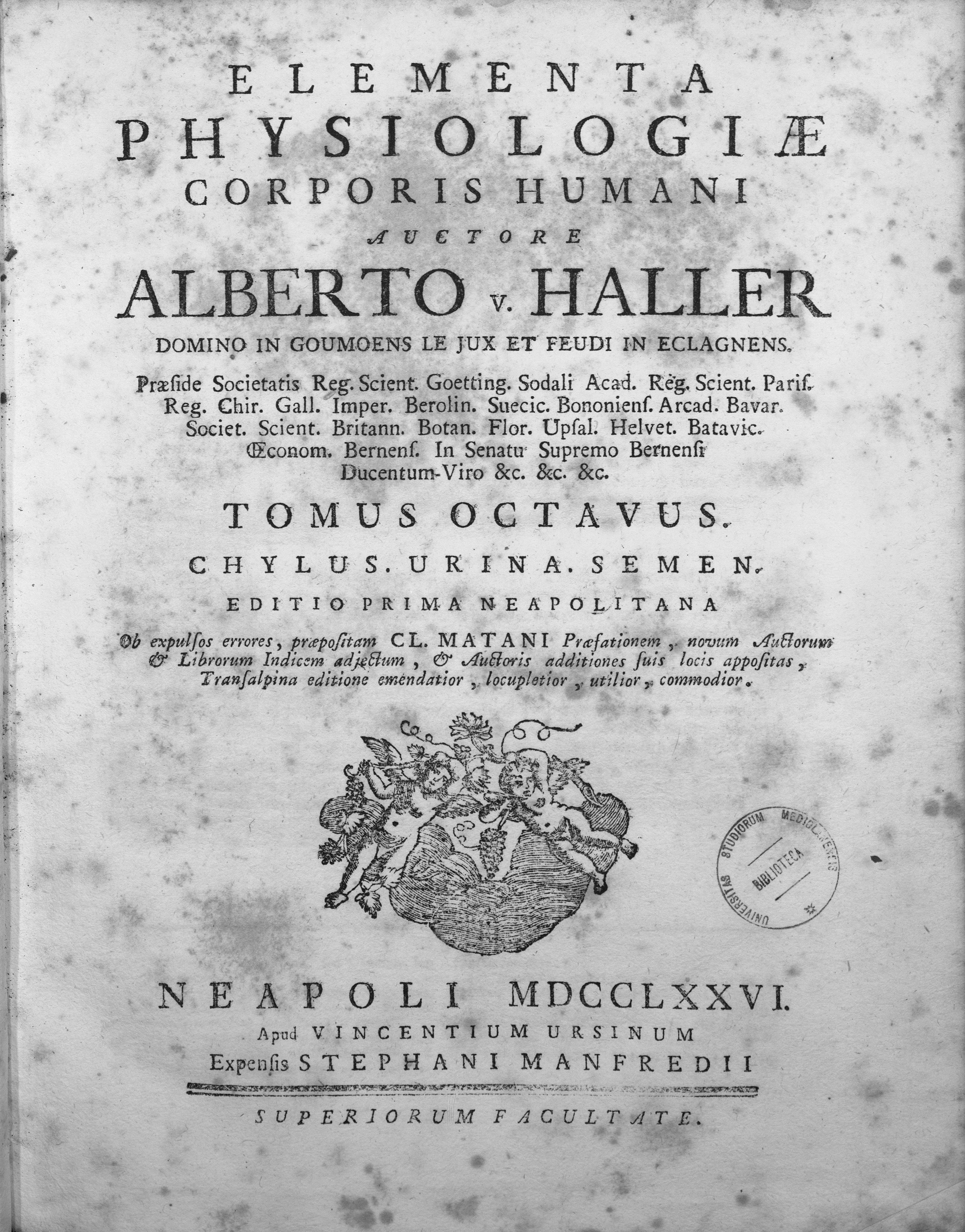
Elementa physiologiae corporis humani VIII

- Sakuta, Manabu (January 2008). "[One hundred books which built up neurology (13)--Albrecht von Haller "Elementa physiologiae corporis humani" (1757–1766)]". Brain and Nerve = Shinkei Kenkyū No Shinpo. 60 (1): 104–5. PMID 18232340.
- Frixione, E (February 2006). "Albrecht von Haller (1708–1777)". J. Neurol. 253 (2): 265–6. doi:10.1007/s00415-006-0998-x. PMID 16485077. S2CID 31096631.
- Birtalan, G (June 1996). "[Albrecht von Haller (1708–1777)]". Orvosi Hetilap. 137 (24): 1319–21. PMID 8757091.
- Fye, W B (May 1995). "Albrecht von Haller". Clinical Cardiology. 18 (5): 291–2. doi:10.1002/clc.4960180513. PMID 7628137. S2CID 5408207.
- Staffelbach, U P (1995). [Illness as metaphor. New thoughts on an old dispute: Julien Offray de la Mettrie and Albrecht von Haller]. Clio medica (Amsterdam, Netherlands). Vol. 31. pp. 141–56. PMID 7774155.
- Boschung, U (1985). "[Albrecht von Haller and the medical practitioner of his era]". Gesnerus. 42 (3–4): 253–64. PMID 3912268.
- Breuning, M (1978). "[Alexander von Humboldt's opinion of Albrecht von Haller]". Gesnerus. 35 (1–2): 132–9. doi:10.1163/22977953-0350102009. PMID 352815.
- Merkulov, V L (January 1978). "[On the 200th anniversary of the death of Albrecht von Haller (1708--1777)]". Fiziologicheskiĭ Zhurnal SSSR imeni I. M. Sechenova. 64 (1): 124–5. PMID 340292.
- Lindskog, G E (January 1978). "Albrecht von Haller. A Bicentennial Memoir". Connecticut Medicine. 42 (1): 49–57. PMID 340128.
- Portmann, M L (1977). "[Variolation as reflected in the correspondence between Albrecht von Haller (1708–1777) and Achilles Mieg (1731–1799)]". Gesnerus. 34 (3–4): 294–303. doi:10.1163/22977953-0340304003. PMID 340348.
- Boschung, U (1977). "[Albrecht von Haller as physician. History of the elixir acidum Halleri]". Gesnerus. 34 (3–4): 267–93. doi:10.1163/22977953-0340304002. PMID 340347.
- Yamagishi, S (July 1976). "[Albrecht von Haller and the development of electrophysiology]". Kango Gijutsu: Nursing Technique. 22 (10): 35–9. PMID 781355.
- Premuda, L (1976). "[Albrecht von Haller and Padua. The effect of his medical thoughts at the end of the 18th century]". Gesnerus. 33 (1–2): 65–78. doi:10.1163/22977953-0330102007. PMID 773779.
- Mazzolini, R G (January 1976). "Two letters on epigenesis from John Turberville Needham to Albrecht von Haller". Journal of the History of Medicine and Allied Sciences. 31 (1): 68–77. doi:10.1093/jhmas/xxxi.1.68. PMID 770567.
- Sonntag, O (September 1974). "The motivations of the scientist: the self-image of Albrecht von Haller". Isis; an International Review Devoted to the History of Science and Its Cultural Influences. 65 (228): 336–51. doi:10.1086/351302. PMID 4611961. S2CID 43858738.
- Belloni, L (April 1971). "Embryological drawings concerning his Theorie von der Generation sent by Caspar Friedrich Wolff to Albrecht von Haller in 1764". Journal of the History of Medicine and Allied Sciences. 26 (2): 205–8. doi:10.1093/jhmas/xxvi.2.205. PMID 4930793.
- Jarcho, S (June 1970). "Albrecht von Haller on inflammation". Am. J. Cardiol. 25 (6): 707–9. doi:10.1016/0002-9149(70)90622-3. PMID 4911942.
- Buess, H (April 1970). "William Harvey and the foundation of modern haemodynamics by Albrecht von Haller". Medical History. 14 (2): 175–82. doi:10.1017/s0025727300015362. PMC 1034038. PMID 4914686.
- Wobmann, P (February 1967). "[Albrecht von Haller, the founder of modern hemodynamics]". Archiv für Kreislaufforschung. 52 (1): 96–128. doi:10.1007/BF02119460. PMID 4872236. S2CID 26741353.
- BERG, F (1964). "Correspondence Between Nils Ros'En Von Rosenstein And Albrecht Von Haller". Acta Paediatrica. Supplementum. 156: 103–108. doi:10.1111/j.1651-2227.1964.tb17649.x. PMID 14163428. S2CID 40599781.
- BUESS, H (April 1959). "Albrecht von Haller and his Elementa Physiologiae as the beginning of pathological physiology". Medical history. 3 (2): 123–31. doi:10.1017/s0025727300024406. PMC 1034463. PMID 13643146.
- FOKINA, E N (February 1959). "[Albrecht von Haller (1708–1777) and his anatomical activity; 250th anniversary of his birth.]". Arkhiv Anatomii, Gistologii i Émbriologii. 36 (2): 83–5. PMID 13638109.
- BUESS, H (December 1958). "[Albrecht von Haller (1708–1777) and the anatomical illustration; a discussion on his 250th birthday.]". Dtsch. Med. Wochenschr. 83 (51): 2303–4. doi:10.1055/s-0028-1113979. PMID 13609377. S2CID 260059977.
- PERUZZI, D (1957). "[Three letters from Giulio Pontedera to Albrecht von Haller.]". La Rassegna di Clinica, Terapia e Scienze Affini. 56 (2): 71–4. PMID 13453759.
- HINTZSCHE, Erich (1951). "[Seven letters from Albrecht von Haller to Johannes Gessner.]". Gesnerus. 8 (1–2): 98–113. doi:10.1163/22977953-0080102010. PMID 14860454.
- WEGELIN, C (1950). "[Letters of Peter Giller, municipal physician of Saint Gallen, to Albrecht von Haller.]". Gesnerus. 7 (1–2): 1–26. PMID 14773782.
