= George Forster =

George Forster may refer to:

- Georg Forster (1754–1794), German scientist and revolutionary; travelled with James Cook
- George Forster (MP)
- Georg Forster (composer), German editor, composer and physician
- George Forster (traveller) (died 1792), English traveller and civil servant of the East India Company
- Sir George Forster, 2nd Baronet (1796–1876), Irish politician
- George Forster (murderer) (died 1803), Englishman executed for manslaughter
- George J. Forster (1905–1988), mayor of Madison, Wisconsin
- George H. Forster (1838–1888), American lawyer and politician from New York
- George Norman Bowes Forster, British Army officer
- George Forster (fl. 1776), a British captain in the Battle of the Cedars

== See also ==
- George Foster (disambiguation)
