= Liz Miller =

Elizabeth Sinclair Miller AKC, MBBS, FRCS(Ed), MRCPG, BA, Dip Occ Med, MSc

Trustee, Stand to Reason
- Incumbent
- Assumed office 2007

Co-Founder and Secretary, Doctors Support Network
- In office 1996–2006

Personal details
- Born: 27 February 1957 (age 69) Bedford, England
- Education: King's College London
- Profession: Physician, surgeon, campaigner, writer
- Website: http://www.drlizmiller.co.uk

Elizabeth Sinclair Miller (born 2 February 1957) is a British physician, surgeon, campaigner and writer noted for her outspoken stance on mental health, and bipolar disorder (manic depression) in particular. Although she has a long history of television and radio appearances, she came to public prominence in Stephen Fry's Emmy Award-winning documentary The Secret Life of the Manic Depressive in 2006. In 2008 she was voted Mind Champion of the Year by public poll.

In the May 2026 South Cambridgeshire District Council elections, Miller stood as a Reform UK candidate for Foxton Ward.

== Biography ==
The daughter of a physician and theatre nurse, Miller is the third generation of her family to become a physician. A difficult child by her own admission, she managed to persuade her parents to send her to Cheltenham Ladies' College at the age of eleven. From there she went to the University of London, graduating from King's College in 1979. After marriage to Richard Armstrong in 1995 she assumed his surname until separation in 1999. She suffered from bipolar disorder and has been completely well and off medication for twenty five years. She has campaigned on behalf of the mentally ill and is now campaigning for reform of healthcare and the NHS, without further privatisation, whilst maintaining its core values.

== Career ==
She began surgical training in 1982 and her Fellowship of the Royal College of Surgeons was conferred in 1983, whereupon she began training as a neurosurgeon. That same year, she developed several melanomas, and believes she might not have received treatment in time had she not been a surgeon. Over the course of the next few years she published several academic papers, and in 1989 was Cheyne Medal runner-up for her paper "The Hypothalamic Control of sodium metabolism and the Syndrome of Inappropriate Natriuresis". The stress of her career, being the only female neurosurgeon in the UK at the time caused her to have a hypomanic episode while practising in Edinburgh that same year. She was sectioned for six months, after which she suffered from depression. She said that this experience gave her the lasting insight that people with severe mental illness are best considered 'damaged; not ill'. "If I have learnt one thing, it is that the brain heals if you give it what it needs to heal."

In 1990, she returned to work in Bedford General Hospital, transferring to Guy's Hospital, London in 1991 to work in Accident and Emergency. In 1992, she had a second mental breakdown and was admitted to the Maudsley Hospital, part of King's College.

== Mood Mapping ==
Miller's first book, Mood Mapping, was published in the autumn of 2009. It is a practical book, guiding the reader to emotional health and happiness.

== Awards ==
- 1989, Cheyne Medal runner up
- 2005, Nominee, Mental Health Survivor Award
- 2008, Mind Champion of the Year

== Major publications ==
- Miller, ES; Neoptolemos, JP; Aitkenhead, AR; Fossard, DP (April 1985). "Management of severe head injuries in a non-neurosurgical trauma centre". Journal of the Royal College of Surgeons of Edinburgh. 30 (2): 82–7. PMID 4020726.
- Miller, Elizabeth; Crockard, Alan H. (June 1987). "Transoral Transclival Removal of Anteriorly Placed Meningiomas at the Foramen Magnum". Neurosurgery. 20 (6): 966–968. doi:10.1227/00006123-198706000-00026. PMID 3614579.
- Miller E.S., Collins I., Seckl J.R. Hyponatraemia following subarachnoid hemorrhage: Sodium loss or fluid gain? Journal of Clinical Sciences (abstract) 1987.
- Miller E.S., Dias P. Uttley D. Subdural empyema; A review of 24 cases. Journal of Neurology, Neurosurgery and Psychiatry. 1987;50:1415–1418.
- Miller E.S., Dias P. Uttley D. A review of one hundred cases of intracranial suppuration managed since the introduction of computerised tomography. British Journal of Neurosurgery 1988;3:105–108
- Miller, E; Montague, A; Crone, P; Kirby, N (1992). "Quality assurance in Guy's Hospital accident and emergency department". Health Trends. 24 (1): 38–40. PMID 10122495.
- Armstrong, E. (19 September 1998). "Safety of patients in drug trials". BMJ. 317 (7161): 818. doi:10.1136/bmj.317.7161.818b. PMC 1113915. PMID 9740580.
- Miller Lizzie Career focus Helping troubled doctors BMJ 2002;324:148
- Miller, L. (1 January 2009). "Doctors, their mental health and capacity for work". Occupational Medicine. 59 (1): 53–55. doi:10.1093/occmed/kqn111. PMID 18796700.
