= George M. Foster =

George M. Foster may refer to:

- Pops Foster (George Murphy Foster, 1892–1969), jazz musician
- George M. Foster (anthropologist) (1913–2006), anthropologist at the University of California, Berkeley

== See also ==
- George Foster (disambiguation)
