= George Foster =

George Foster may refer to:

== Politics ==
- George Buchanan Foster (1897–1974), Canadian flying ace, attorney, and legislator
- George Eulas Foster (1847–1931), Canadian politician
- George Foster (Australian politician) (1884–1956), Australian Senator
- George Peter Foster (1858–1928), U.S. Representative from Illinois
- George S. Foster (1874–1936), American politician from Maine
- George Foster Peabody (1852–1938), American educator and political figure
- George Foster (US politician and physicist) (born 1955), American physicist and politician
- George Foster (MP) for Boston, England

== Sportspeople ==
- George Foster (American football) (born 1980), former American football player
- George Foster (baseball) (born 1948), American former baseball player
- George Foster (boxer) (1940–2019), former American boxer
- George Foster (footballer) (born 1956), former British football player and manager for Plymouth Argyle F.C.

== Other people ==
- George Green Foster (1860–1931), Canadian lawyer and politician
- George P. Foster (1835–1879), Union general in the American Civil War
- George Foster, pen-name of Jock Haswell (1919–2018), British soldier, intelligence officer and author
- George Burman Foster (1858–1919), American theologian at the University of Chicago
- George M. Foster (anthropologist) (1913–2006), anthropologist at the University of California, Berkeley
- George Washington Foster (1866–1923), African-American architect
- George Foster (musician) (Pops Foster, 1892–1969), jazz musician
- George Foster (murderer) (also called Forster, died 1803), convicted criminal whose body was experimented on after he was hanged

== See also ==
- George Forster (disambiguation)
