= Doctors Support Network =

Self help group for physician in UK

The 'Doctors' Support Network' (DSN) is a confidential self-help group for physicians in the United Kingdom with mental health concerns. It was founded by Dr Soames Michelson and Dr Liz Miller in 1996. Registered Charity Number (England & Wales): 1103741

The DSN has approximately 500 members and has successfully campaigned for better treatment of doctors with mental health issues by the General Medical Council.
