= Giovanni Aldini =

Italian physician and physicist (1762–1834)

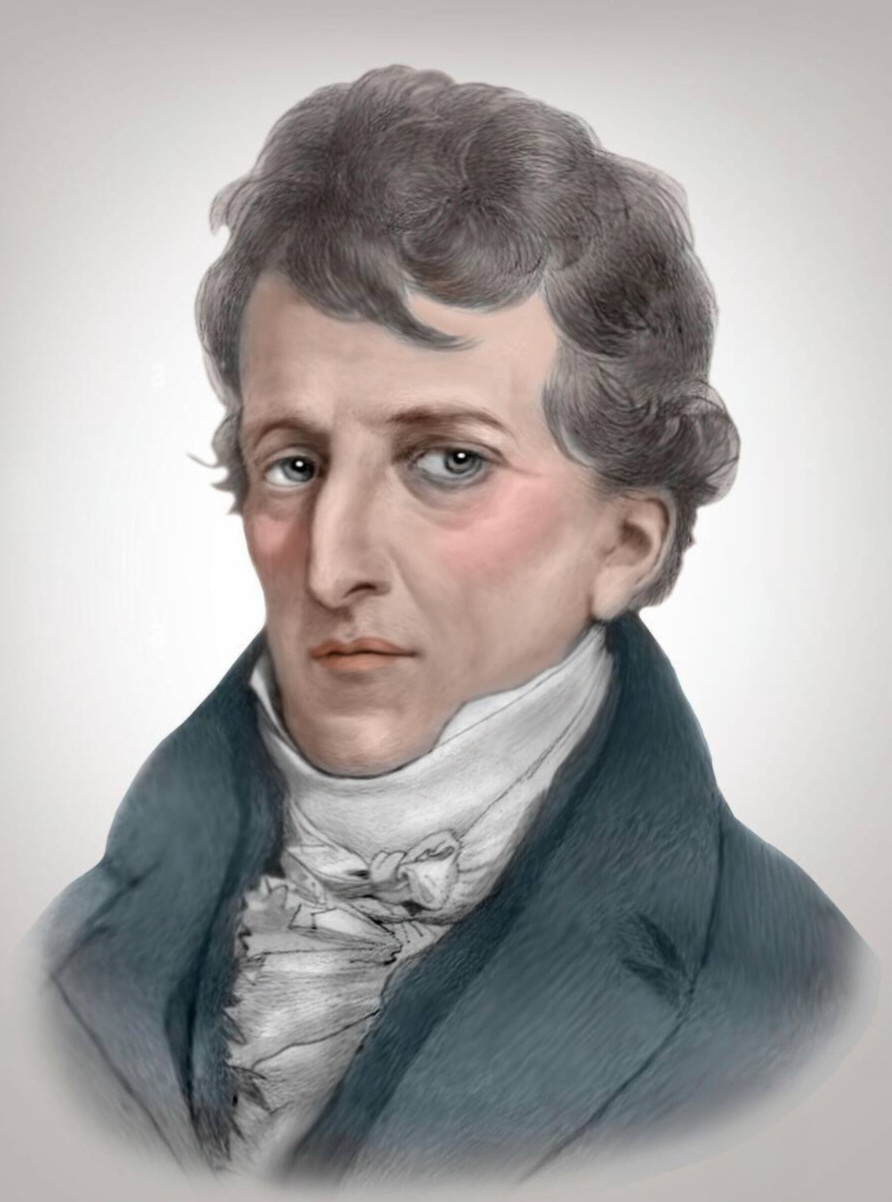
- Portrait of Giovanni Aldini, 1829
- Born: 10 April 1762; Bologna, Papal States
- Died: 17 January 1834 (aged 71); Milan, Kingdom of Lombardy–Venetia
- Education: University of Bologna
- Occupations: Physician; Physicist
- Awards: Order of the Iron Crown
- Scientific career
- Workplaces: University of Bologna

Signature
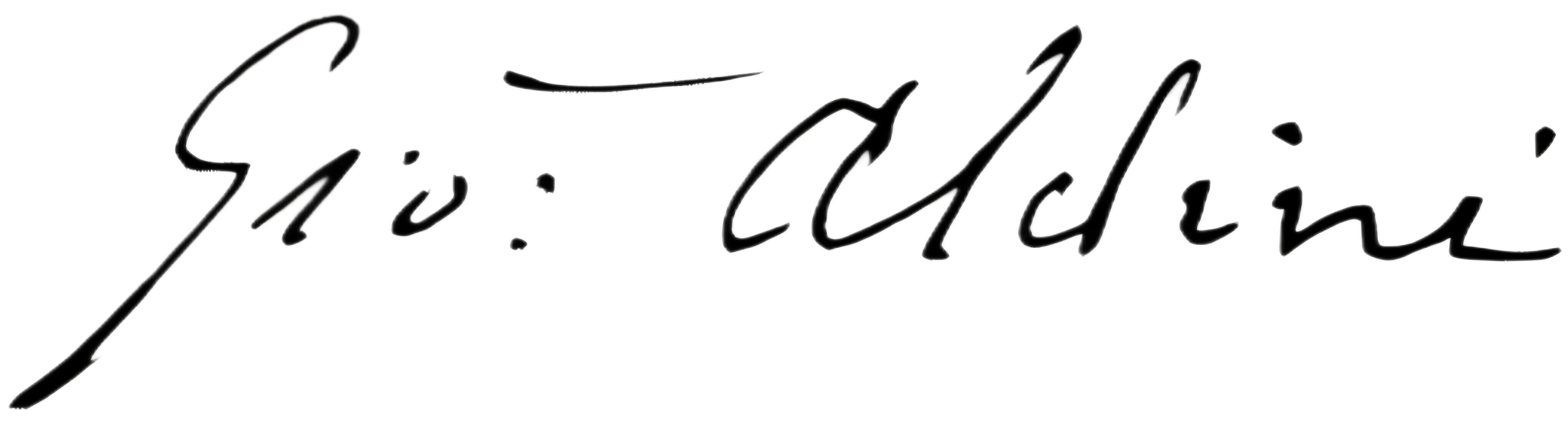

Giovanni Aldini (10 April 1762 – 17 January 1834) was an Italian medical doctor and physicist born in Bologna. He is considered a pioneer in the field of electrophysiology. His work on Galvanism – the electrical stimulation of muscles – significantly advanced 19th-century understanding of physiology, electrotherapy, and the nature of bioelectricity.

== Biography ==
Giovanni Aldini was born in Bologna on 10 April 1762. He was the nephew of the renowned scientist Luigi Galvani, a pioneer in electrical research, and the brother of Count Antonio Aldini, who served as Secretary of State for the Kingdom of Italy from 1805 to 1814. After graduating in physics from the University of Bologna in 1782, he began working as a research assistant in Galvani's laboratory in Bologna, focusing on muscle contraction experiments. In 1798, he was appointed professor of experimental physics at the University of Bologna taking the chair formerly held by his teacher, Sebastiano Canterzani.

Aldini's scientific work was chiefly concerned with galvanism, anatomy and its medical applications, with the construction and illumination of lighthouses, and with experiments for preserving human life and material objects from destruction by fire. He took part in the controversy between Galvani and Volta over animal electricity and was one of the greatest populariser of galvanism. Aldini edited Galvani's main paper for general distribution, De viribus electricitatis in motu musculari commentarius, published in Modena in 1792. He wrote in French and English in addition to his native Italian, and in Latin, still used in the 18th century by the scientific community.

Aldini was one of the earliest and most active members of the National Institute of Italy, to the foundation of which he contributed. In recognition of his merits, the emperor of Austria made him a Knight of the Iron Crown and a councillor of state at Milan. Aldini spent the last years of his life in Milan, where he died on 17 January 1834, at the age of 71. He bequeathed a considerable sum to found a school of natural science for artisans at Bologna. In his honour, the municipality commissioned a marble portrait, realized by Giuseppe Pacchioni, which was placed in the Pantheon of the Certosa di Bologna.

== Experiments ==
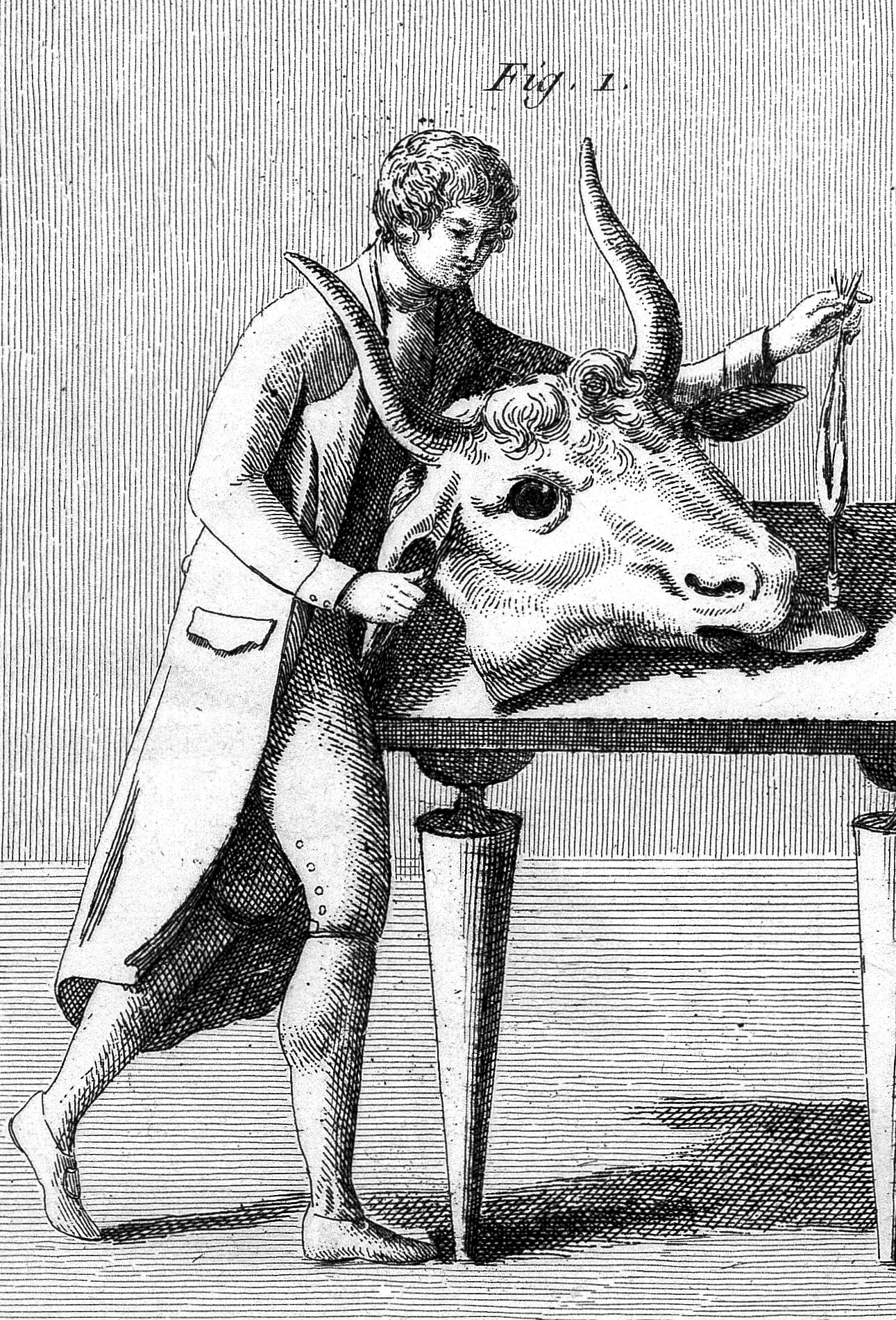
Aldini demonstrating electricity generated by an ox head

Like his uncle, Aldini was a vitalist who believed in the existence of an electrical juice generated in the brain and flowing through the nerves to supply the muscles with power. After the death of his uncle he became one of the most prolific experimenter and writer on the subject of animal electricity. He conducted famous public demonstrations of electro-stimulation to prove that electric current could reanimate muscle tissue in deceased animals and humans. Aldini's most famous public demonstration of the electro-stimulation technique of deceased limbs was performed on the executed criminal George Forster at Newgate in London in 1803. The electrical stimulation created such violent movements in the corpse that many onlookers believed the dead man was on the verge of returning to life. The Newgate Calendar describes what happened when the galvanic process was used on the body:

On the first application of the process to the face, the jaws of the deceased criminal began to quiver, and the adjoining muscles were horribly contorted, and one eye was actually opened. In the subsequent part of the process, the right hand was raised and clenched, and the legs and thighs were set in motion.

Aldini's experiment created a sensation since it seemed to demonstrate that electricity could be used to revive the deceased. The demonstration was widely reported in newspapers like The Times and sparked heated controversy in English scientific circles between supporters of galvanism and their detractors. According to Charles Hunnings Wilkinson, who assisted Aldini with his experiments, it provided proof that galvanism was "an energising principle, which forms the line of distinction between matter and spirit, constituting in the great chain of the creation, the intervening link between corporeal substance and the essence of vitality". In 1814, the English surgeon John Abernethy defended Aldini's theory in the annual Hunterian Lecture at the Royal College of Surgeons, claiming that electricity was the "élan vital" that could explain life processes. Aldini's theories were opposed by William Lawrence, who argued that the processes of life could be reduced to a mechanistic process.

== Shelley's Frankenstein association ==
Although Mary Shelley was just 5 years old when Forster was executed, it has been suggested that Aldini might have been the inspiration for her famous fictional character Victor Frankenstein. Shelley was well read in the sciences and her husband Percy Bysshe Shelley was an amateur chemist with a profound interest in electricity and galvanic experimentation. In her introduction to the 1831 edition of Frankenstein, she does not mention Aldini, but "galvanism" was among the evening discussion topics before she experienced her "waking dream" that led to her writing. The similarity between Frankenstein and Aldini's experiments can be grasped from Shelley's description of the awakening of the creature in Chapter 5 of the novel:

By the glimmer of the half-extinguished light, I saw the dull yellow eye of the creature open; it breathed hard, and a convulsive motion agitated its limbs.

== Selected works ==
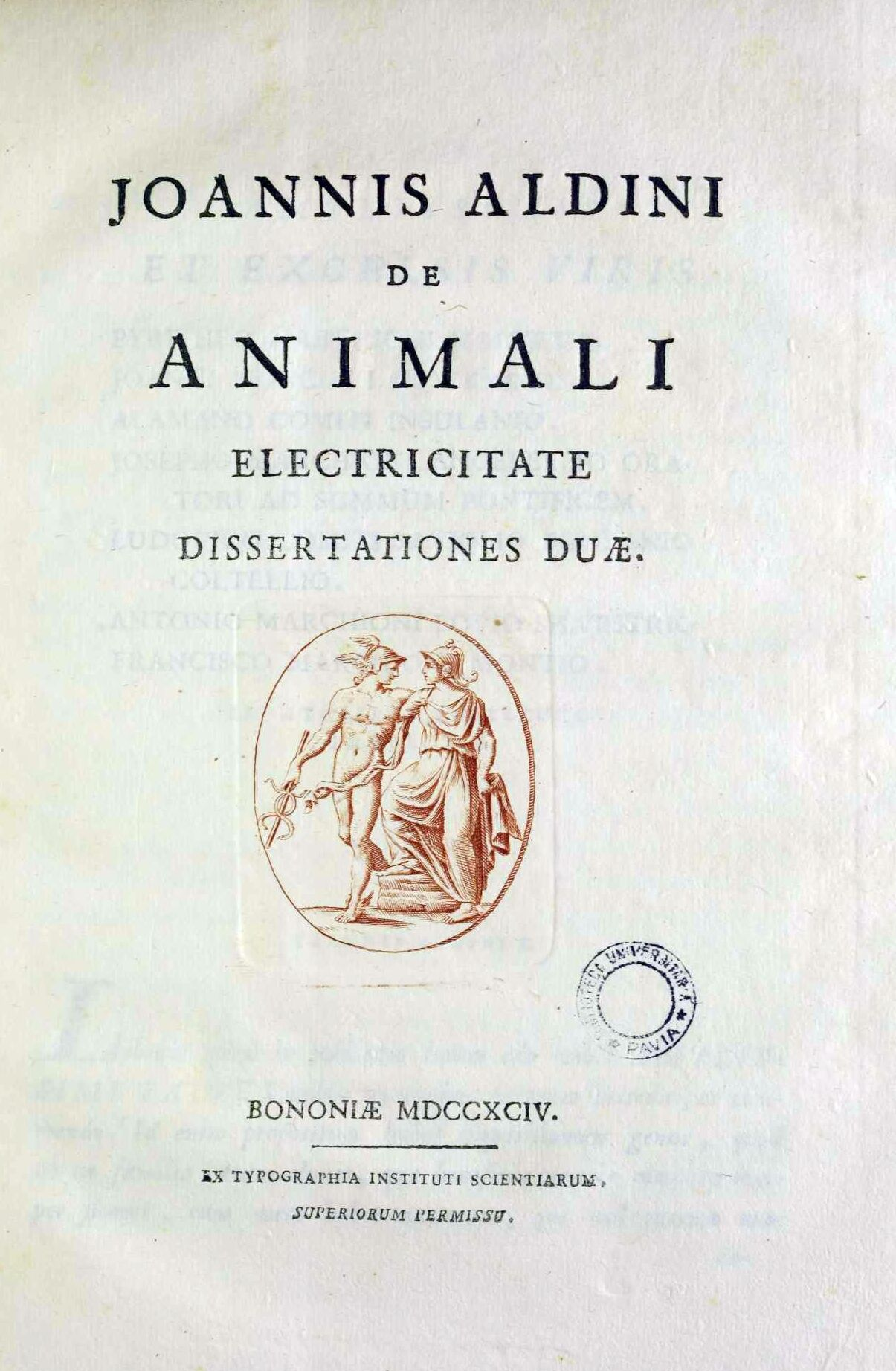
De animali electricitate ("The animal electricity"), 1794

- De viribus electricitatis in motu musculari commentarius cum I. A. dissertatione et notis, Modena, 1792.
- De animali electricitate. Bologna: Stamperia dell'Instituto delle Scienze. 1794.
- Précis des expériences galvaniques, Paris, 1803; an account of some experiments made by Aldini, principally upon the bodies of dead animals. This work was translated from the French manuscript into English, and published under the title An Account of the late improvements in Galvanism, by John Aldini, London, 1803, with an appendix, containing experiments upon the bodies of executed criminals, performed by Aldini in Newgate and Bologna.
- Essai théorique et expérimental sur le galvanisme, avec une série d’expériences faites devant des commissaires de l’Institut national de France, et en divers amphithéâtres anatomiques de Londres [Theoretical and Experimental Essay on Galvanism: With a Series of Experiments Made in the Presence of the Commissioners of the National Institute of France, and in Various Anatomical Amphitheaters in London]. Paris: Fournier Fils. 1804.
- General Views on the Application of Galvanism to Medical Purposes; Principally in Cases of Suspended Animation, London, 1819. The treatise explores the potential of electricity to revive individuals in a state of suspended animation.
