= Hallerian physiology =

Hallerian physiology was a theory competing with galvanism in Italy in the late 18th century. It is named after Albrecht von Haller, a Swiss physician who is considered the father of neurology.

The Hallerians' fundamental tenet held that muscular movements were produced by a mechanical force, different from life and from the nervous system, and which operated beyond consciousness. He claimed that only the muscular fibers have the ability of contraction, which he called irritability, and was responsible for movement.

The activity of this function could be controlled in dead and dissected animals by touching a metal knife to the muscle fiber or by a spark being discharged on them. The electricity operated only as a stimulus of irritability, and it was irritability which was the one, true cause of the contractions.

== Sources ==
- The Controversy on Animal Electricity in Eighteenth-Century Italy: Galvani, Volta and Others by Walter Bernardi
