= Galvanism =

Early study of the electric properties of animal tissue

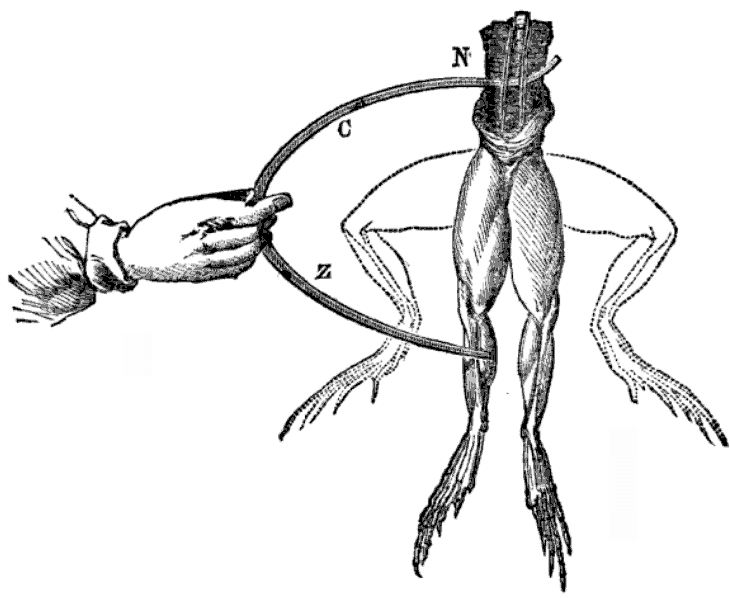
Galvanism: electrodes touch a frog, and the legs twitch into the upward position

Galvanism is a term coined by the late 18th-century physicist and chemist Alessandro Volta to refer to the generation of electric current by chemical action. The term also came to refer to the discoveries of its namesake, Luigi Galvani, specifically the generation of electric current within biological organisms and the contraction/convulsion of biological muscle tissue upon contact with electric current. While Volta theorized and later demonstrated the phenomenon of his "Galvanism" to be replicable with otherwise inert materials, Galvani thought his discovery to be a confirmation of the existence of "animal electricity," a vital force which gave life to organic matter.

== History ==
=== Johann Georg Sulzer ===
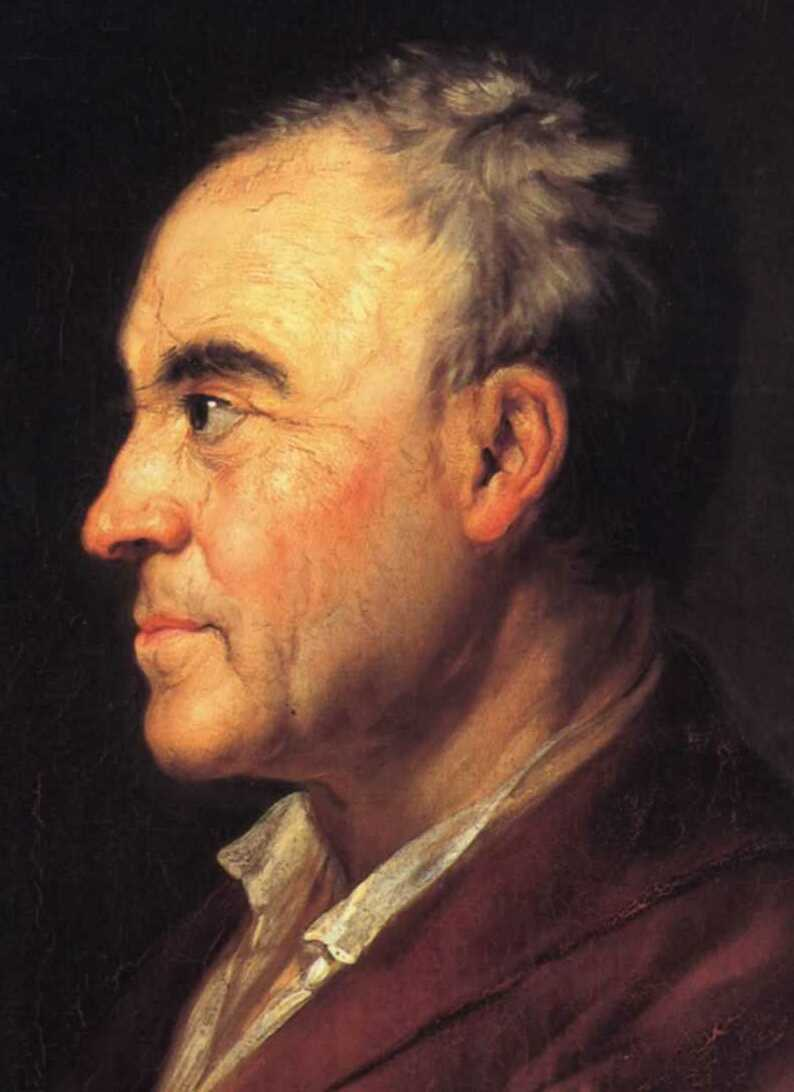
Johann Georg Sulzer

Galvanic phenomena were described in the literature before it was understood that they were of an electrical nature. In 1752, when the Swiss mathematician and physicist Johann Georg Sulzer placed his tongue between a piece of lead and a piece of silver, joined at their edges, he perceived a taste similar to that of iron(II) sulfate. Neither of the metals alone produced this taste. He realized that the contact between the metals probably did not produce a solution of either on the tongue. He did, however, not realize that this was an electrical phenomenon. He concluded that the contact between the metals caused their particles to vibrate, producing this taste by stimulating the nerves of the tongue.

If we join two pieces, one of lead, and the other of silver, so that the two edges join, and if we approach them with the tongue we will feel some taste, quite similar to the taste of vitriol of iron [iron(II) sulfate], while each piece apart gives no trace of this taste. It is not probable that through this junction of the two metals, any solution of one or the other occurs, and that the dissolved particles penetrate the tongue. We must therefore conclude that the junction of these metals produces in one or the other, or in both, a vibration in their particles, and that this vibration, which must necessarily affect the nerves of the tongue, produces there the taste mentioned.

— Johann Georg Sulzer, “Recherches sur l'origine des sentimens agréables et désagréables: Troisième partie. Des plaisirs des sens”

=== Luigi Galvani ===
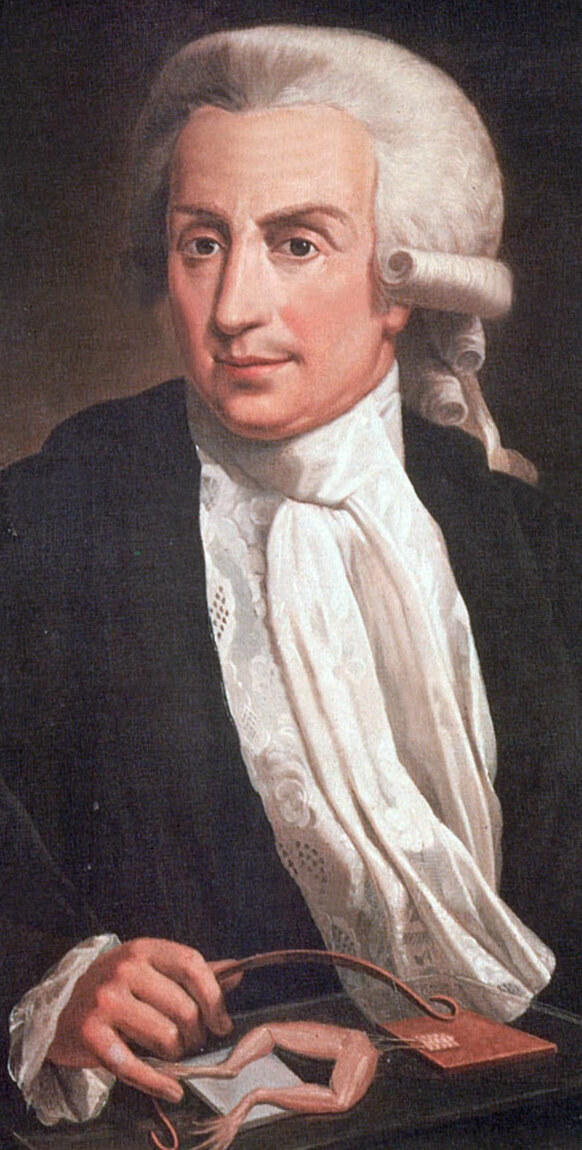
Luigi Galvani

According to popular legend, Galvani discovered the effects of electricity on muscle tissue when investigating an unrelated phenomenon which required skinned frogs in the 1780s and 1790s. His assistant is claimed to have accidentally touched a scalpel to the sciatic nerve of the frog and this resulted in a spark and animation of its legs. This was building on the theories of Giovanni Battista Beccaria, Felice Fontana, Leopoldo Marco Antonio Caldani, and Tommaso Laghi. Galvani was investigating the effects of distant atmospheric electricity (lightning) on prepared frog legs when he discovered the legs convulsed not only when lightning struck but also when he pressed the brass hooks attached to the frog's spinal cord to the iron railing they were suspended from. In his laboratory, Galvani later discovered that he could replicate this phenomenon by touching metal electrodes of brass connected to the frog's spinal cord to an iron plate. He concluded that this was proof of "animal electricity," the electric power which animated living things.

=== Alessandro Volta ===
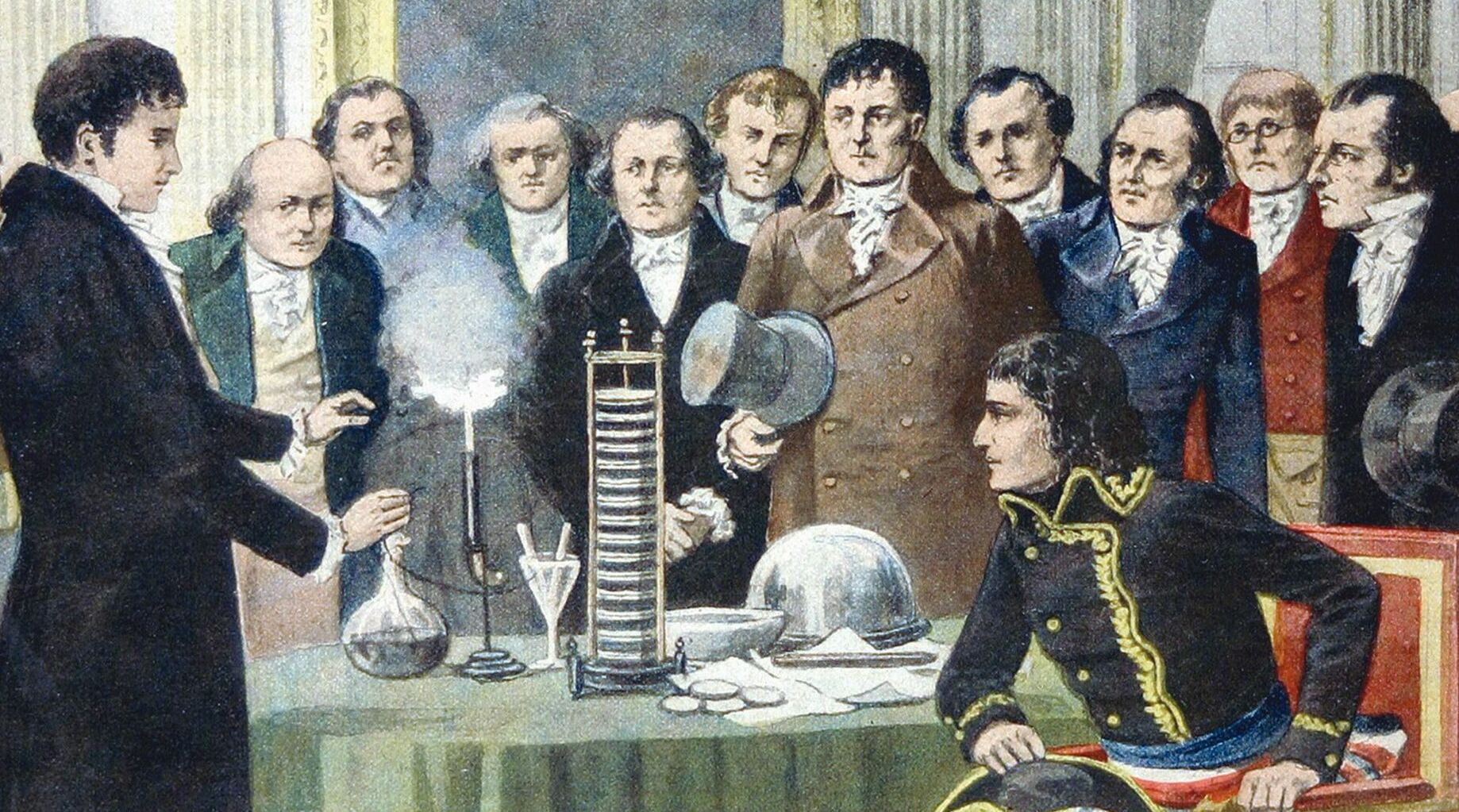
Alessandro Volta demonstrates his battery to Napoleon.

Alessandro Volta, a contemporary physicist, believed that the effect was explicable not by any vital force but rather it was the presence of two different metals that was generating the electricity. Volta demonstrated his theory by creating the first chemical electric battery. Despite their differences in opinion, Volta named the phenomenon of the chemical generation of electricity "Galvanism" after Galvani.

=== Galvani publishes his work ===
On March 27, 1791, Galvani published a book about his work on animal electricity. It contained comprehensive details of his 11 years of research and experimentation on the topic.

The 1797 edition of Gren’s Grundriss der Naturlehre provides the first explicit definition of 'galvanism' as clearly reflecting Volta’s opinion in the following terms:

Galvani from Bologna was the first to observe muscular motions elicited by the contact between two different metals; after him, the phenomena of this sort were termed and included under the name of Galvanism.

=== Giovanni Aldini ===
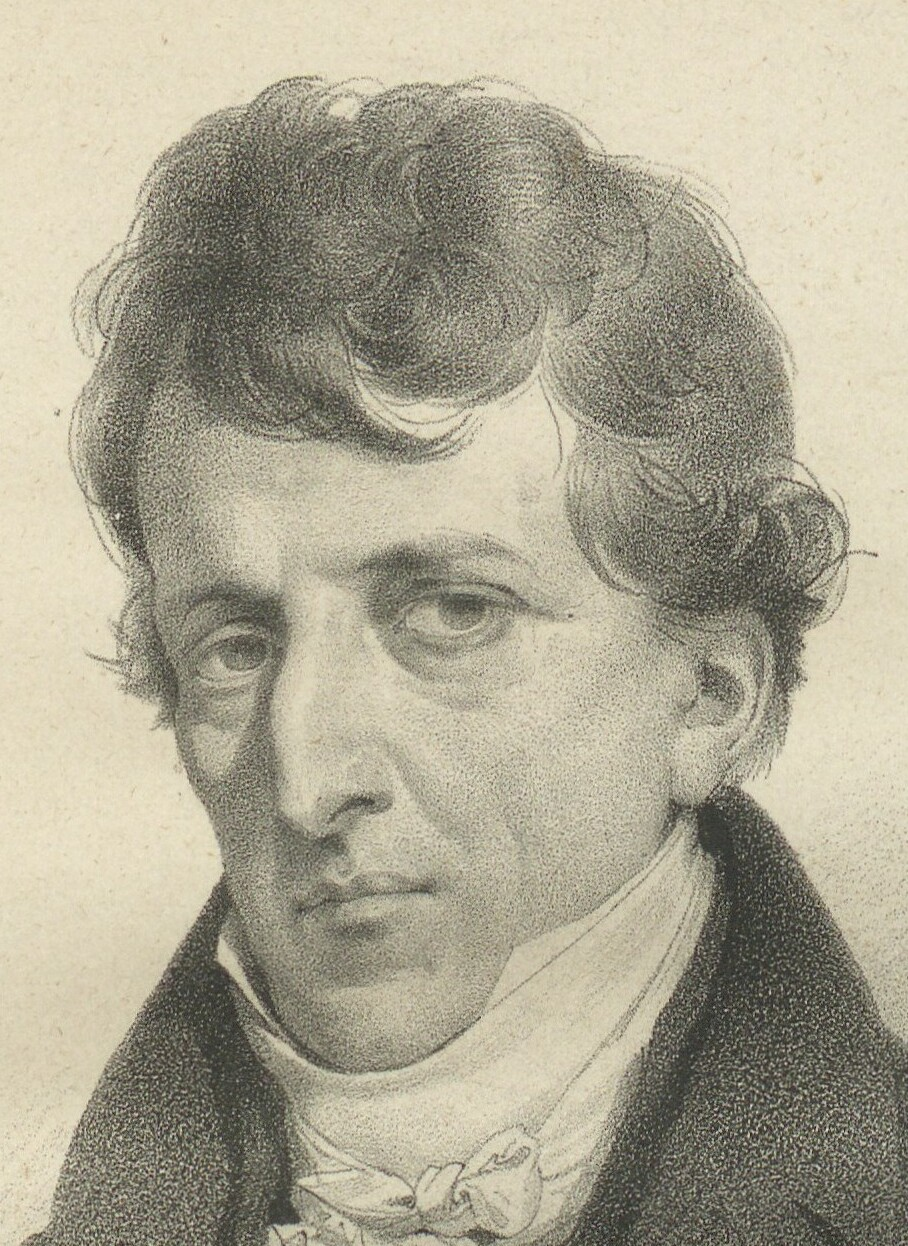
Giovanni Aldini

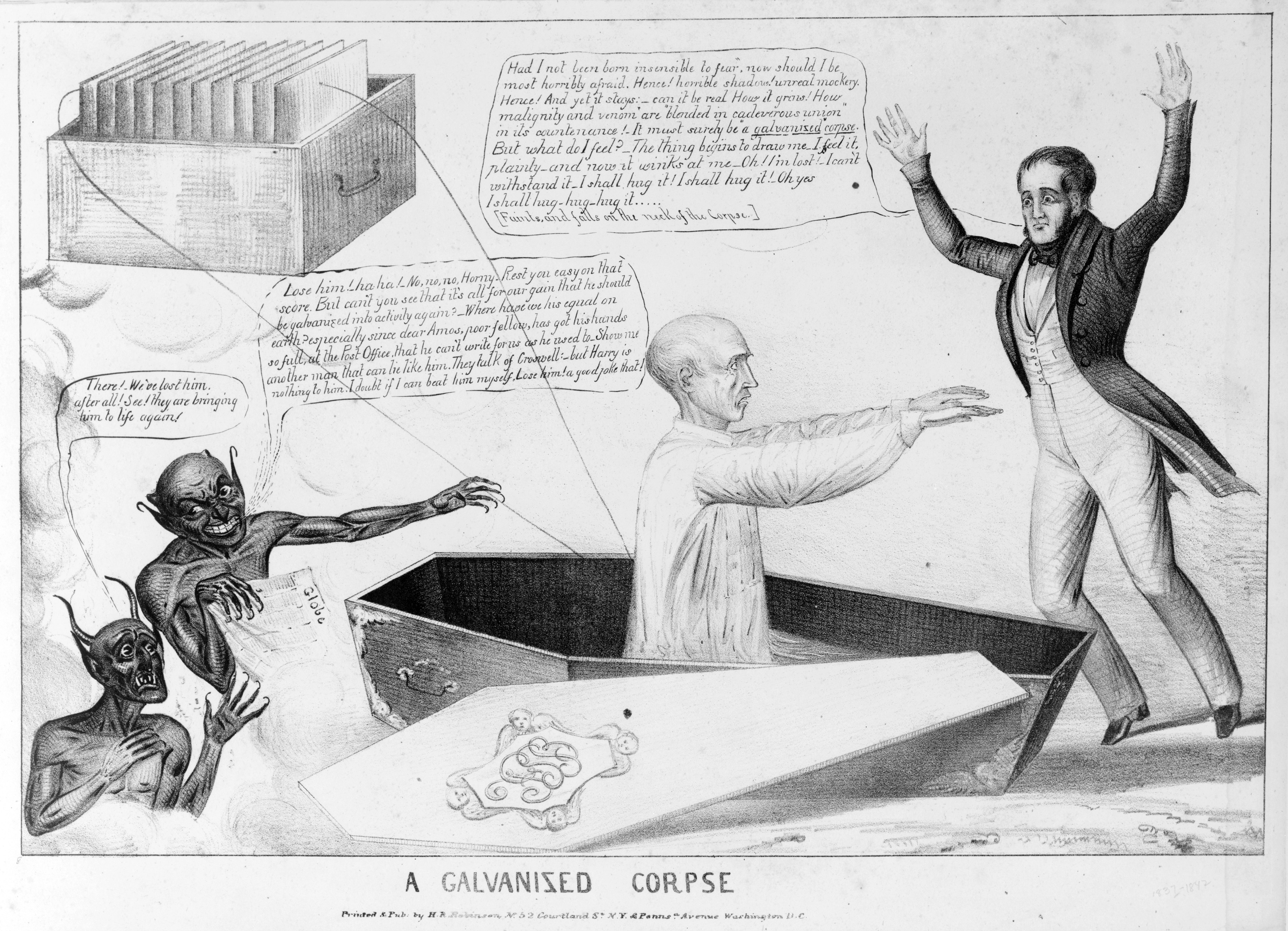
Cartoon of a galvanized corpse

Giovanni Aldini, Galvani's nephew, continued his uncle's work after Luigi Galvani died in 1798. In 1803, Aldini performed a famous public demonstration of the electro-stimulation technique of deceased limbs on the corpse of an executed criminal George Foster at Newgate in London. The Newgate Calendar describes what happened when the galvanic process was used on the body:

On the first application of the process to the face, the jaws of the deceased criminal began to quiver, and the adjoining muscles were horribly contorted, and one eye was actually opened. In the subsequent part of the process the right hand was raised and clenched, and the legs and thighs were set in motion.

Galvani has been called the father of electrophysiology. The debate between Galvani and Volta "would result in the creation of electrophysiology, electromagnetism, electrochemistry and the electric battery."

== Scientific and intellectual legacy ==
"The storm which was produced by the appearance of the above-named [Galvani's] Commentary among philosophers, physiologists and physicians, can only be compared to that which disturbed at that time (1791) the political horizon of Europe." (Du Bois-Reymond)

Galvanism helped permeate the Romantic sciences, such as Naturphilosophie, opening a new field of investigation concerning the possibility of penetrating deeply into the secrets and hidden forces of life.

=== Literature ===
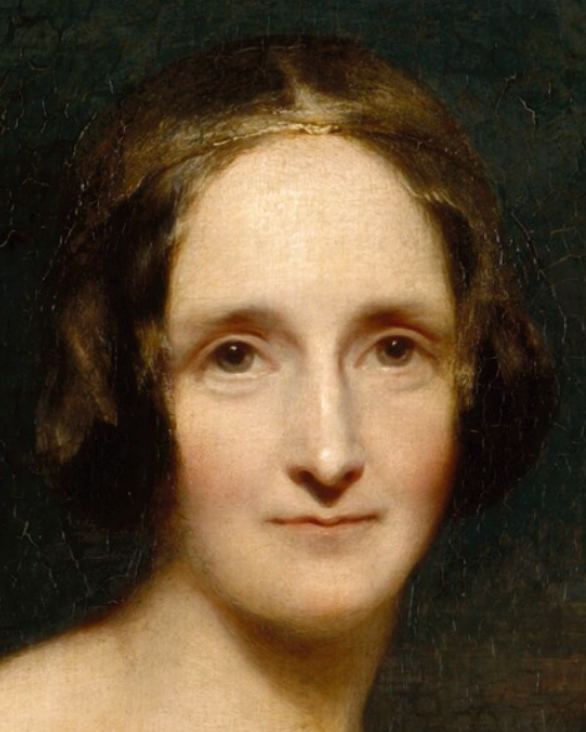
Mary Shelley

Mary Shelley's Frankenstein, wherein a man forms a human body from previously inert flesh and brings it to life, was inspired in part by the theory and demonstrations of Galvanism which may have been conducted by James Lind.

=== Abiogenesis ===
Galvanism influenced metaphysical thought in the domain of abiogenesis, the underlying process of the generation of living forms. In 1836, Andrew Crosse recorded what he referred to as "the perfect insect, standing erect on a few bristles which formed its tail," as having appeared during an experiment wherein he used electricity to produce mineral crystals. While Crosse himself never claimed to have generated the insects, even in private, the scientific world at the time viewed the connection between life and electricity to be sufficiently clear that he received threats against his life for this "blasphemy."

=== Medicine ===
Giovanni Aldini is claimed to have applied Galvanic principles (application of electricity to biological organisms) in successfully alleviating the symptoms of "several cases of insanity", and with "complete success". Today, electroconvulsive therapy is used as a treatment option for severely depressed pregnant mothers (as it is the least harmful for the developing fetus) and people suffering treatment-resistant major depressive disorder. It is found to be effective for half of those who receive treatment while the other half may relapse within 12 months.

The modern application of electricity to the human body for medical diagnostics and treatments is practiced under the term electrophysiology. This includes the monitoring of the electric activity of the heart, muscles, and even the brain, respectively termed electrocardiography, electromyography, and electrocorticography.

== See also ==
- Action potential
- Bioelectromagnetics
- Electrochemistry
- Electrohomeopathy
- Electrotherapy
- Electrotherapy (cosmetic)
- Hallerian physiology, for a counter-theory to Galvanism
