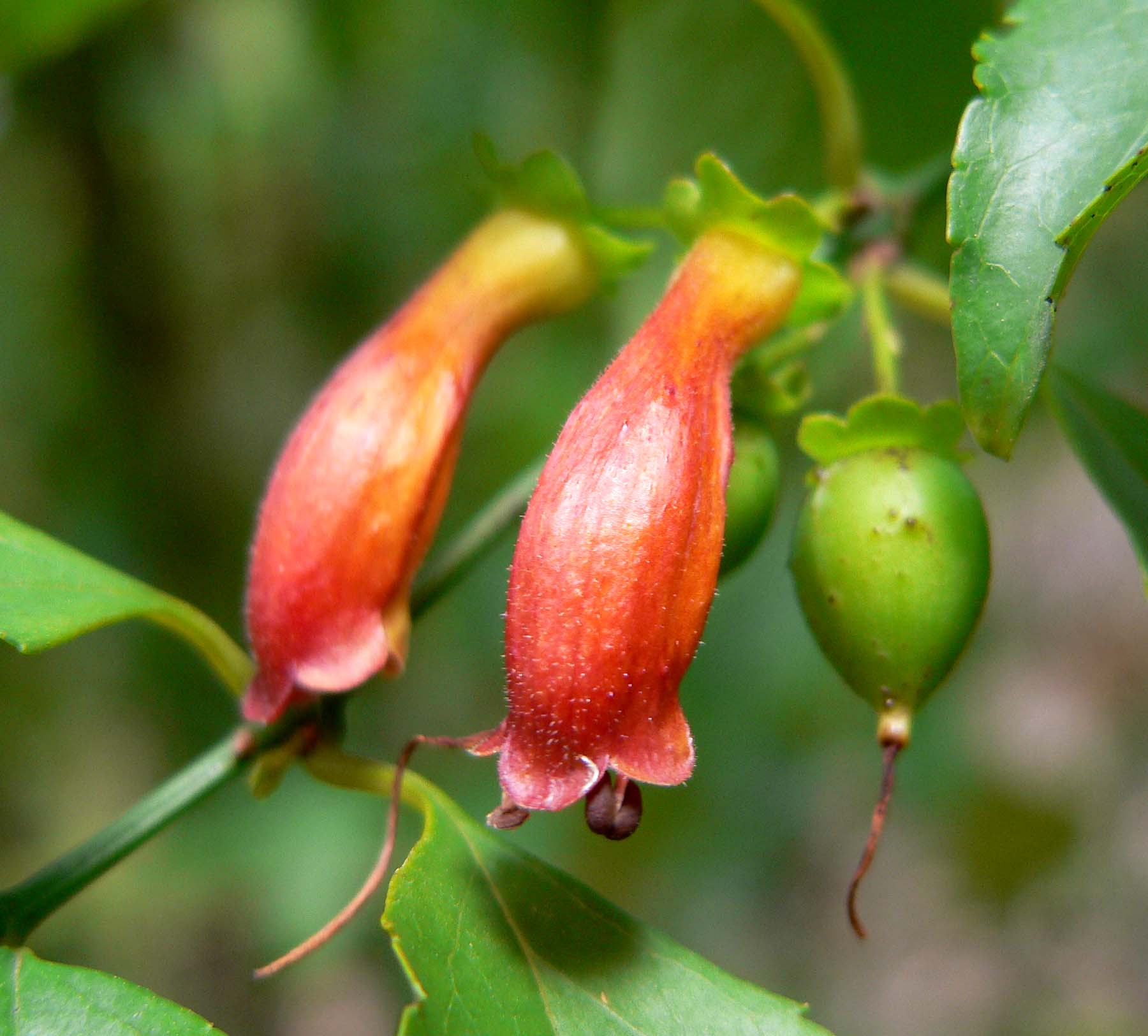

Scientific classification
- Kingdom: Plantae
- Clade: Tracheophytes
- Clade: Angiosperms
- Clade: Eudicots
- Clade: Asterids
- Order: Lamiales
- Family: Stilbaceae
- Genus: Halleria
- Species: H. lucida

Binomial name
- Halleria lucida L.

= Halleria lucida =

Species of tree

Halleria lucida (also known as tree fuchsia, umBinza or notsung) is a small, attractive, evergreen tree that is indigenous to Southern Africa. It is increasingly grown as an ornamental tree in African gardens.

== Appearance ==
This tree has lush, glossy, bright-green foliage on arching and drooping branches. It is often multi-stemmed and can eventually reach a height of over 15m. The way that the dense foliage droops from the hanging branches gives the tree a willowy appearance.
Notsung is unusual in producing its flowers and fruit, not from the tips of its branches like most flowering trees, but from its trunk, exhibiting what is known in botany as cauliflory. This characteristic is also found in other Southern African trees such as Stamvrug. The orange or purple flowers are rich in nectar and bi-sexual. The small, fleshy fruits are edible (but do not taste particularly good). It is a member of the Snapdragon family.

== Distribution ==
The natural range of this tree extends throughout South Africa, as well as northwards through East Africa as far as Ethiopia.

Its natural habitats include deep afro-montane forest, forest fringes, open mountain slopes, gorges and river banks. Like many other trees, in a shady habitat (like deep forest) Halleria lucida grows tall and slender; while it forms a smaller shrub-like tree if grown in the open.

== Growing Halleria lucida ==
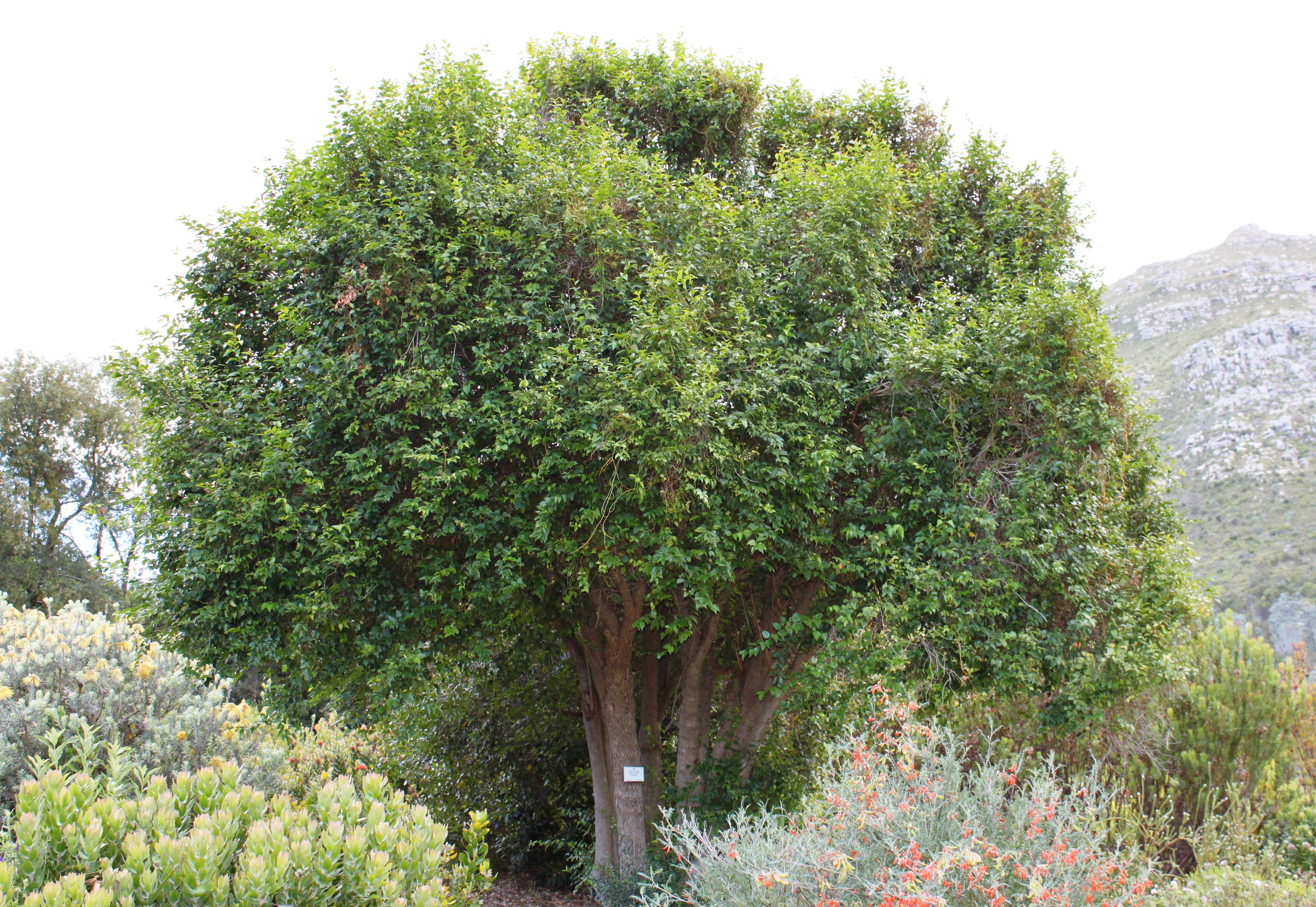
On Table Mountain

Tough and easy to grow, Halleria lucida is becoming popular as an ornamental tree for gardens. It is undoubtedly one of the best trees in Africa for attracting birds, but it is usually grown more for its attractive foliage and flowers. It tolerates full sun as well as partial shade and, once established, it can also survive moderate drought. This makes it particularly suitable for growing in mildly arid areas. It is also a relatively fast-growing tree.

This is an excellent tree for bringing birds to the garden. Nectivorous birds such as sunbirds are attracted to the bright flowers, and the fruits attract a large range of other birds.

The leaves and fruits of Halleria lucida are an important component of traditional African medicine. In addition, it has a function in traditional Zulu religion, as the ceremonial burning of the leaves is believed to counter witchcraft and summon the protective spirits of dead ancestors.

== Gallery ==
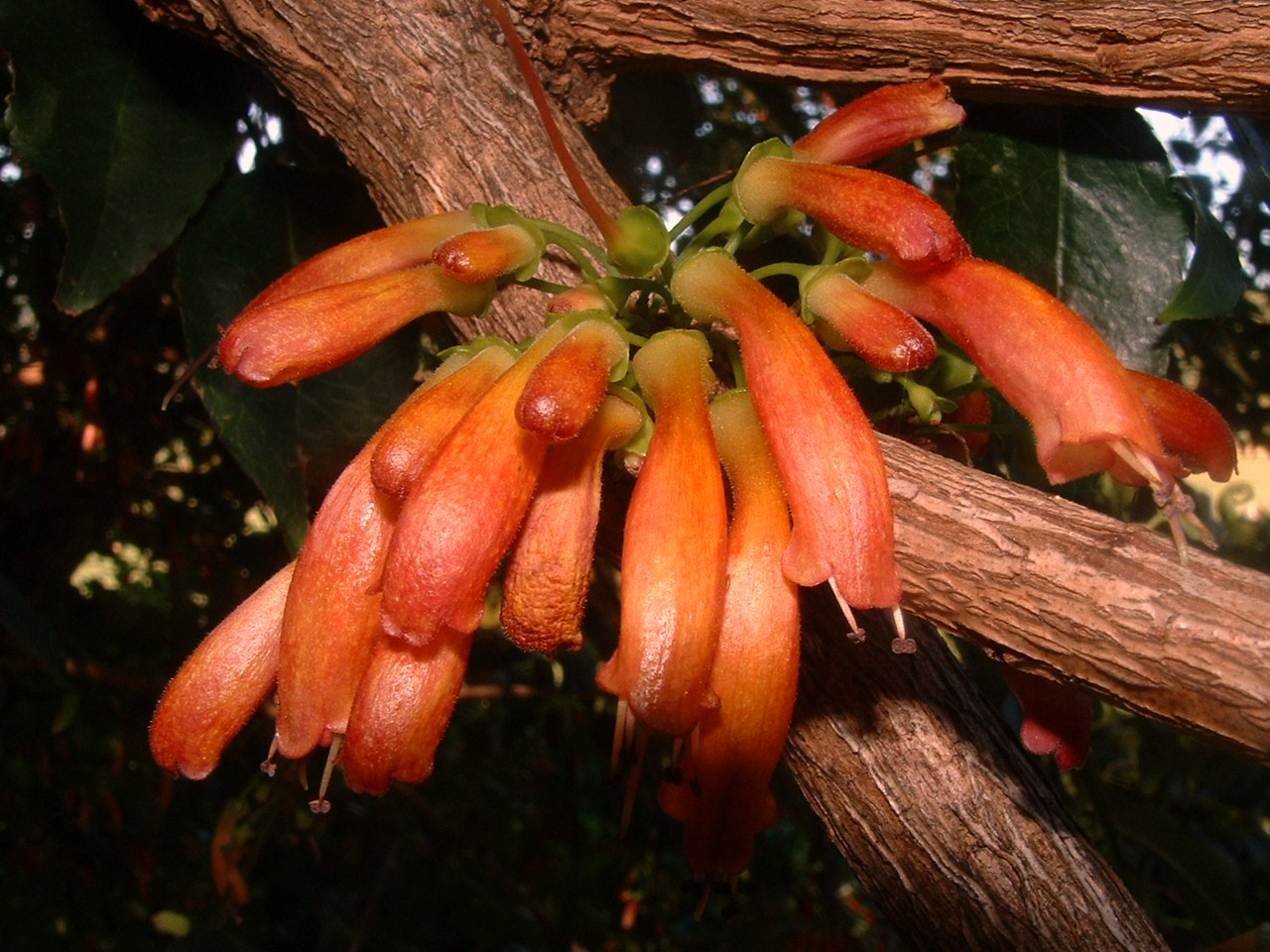
Flowers

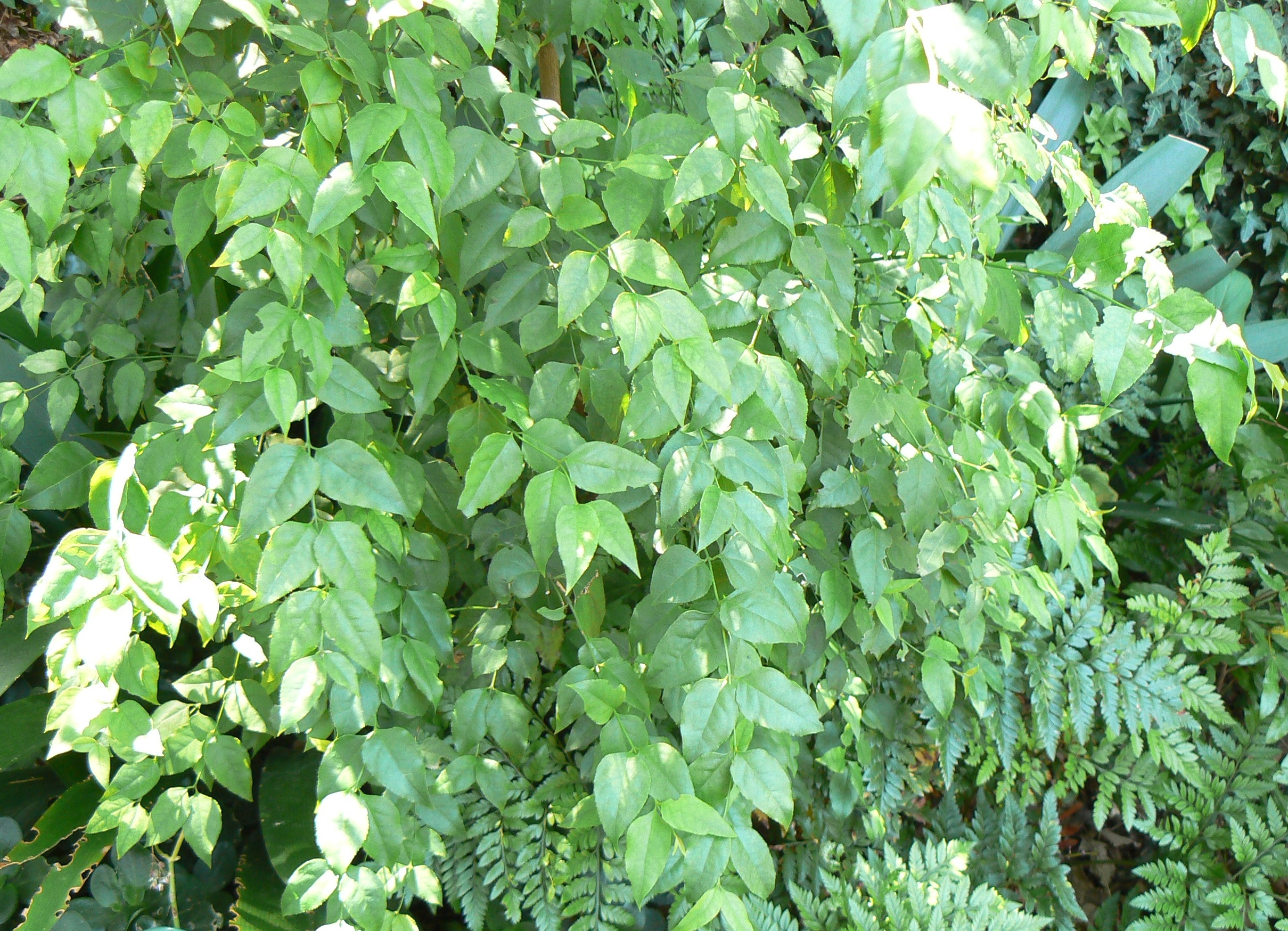
Foliage

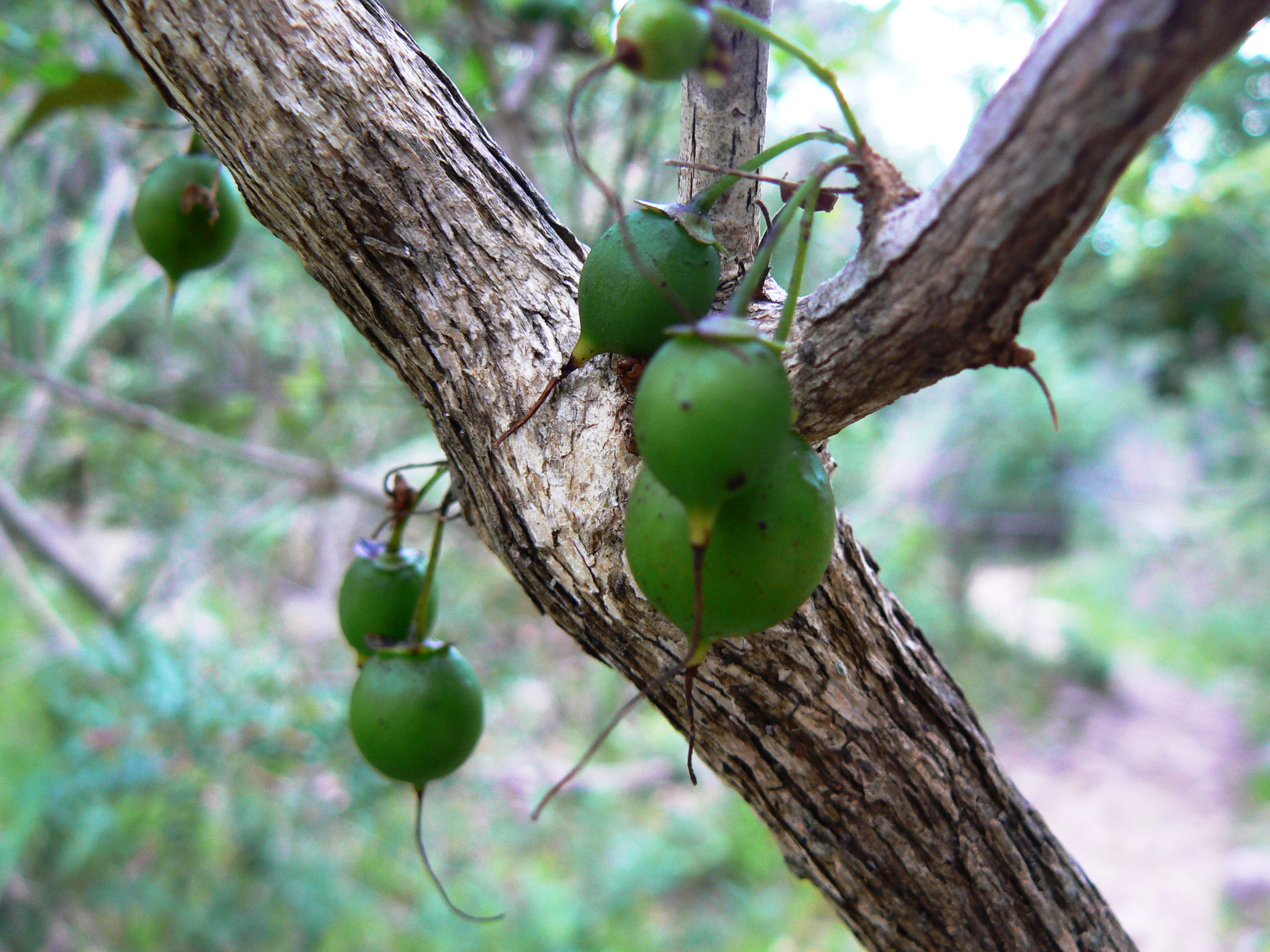
Immature fruit

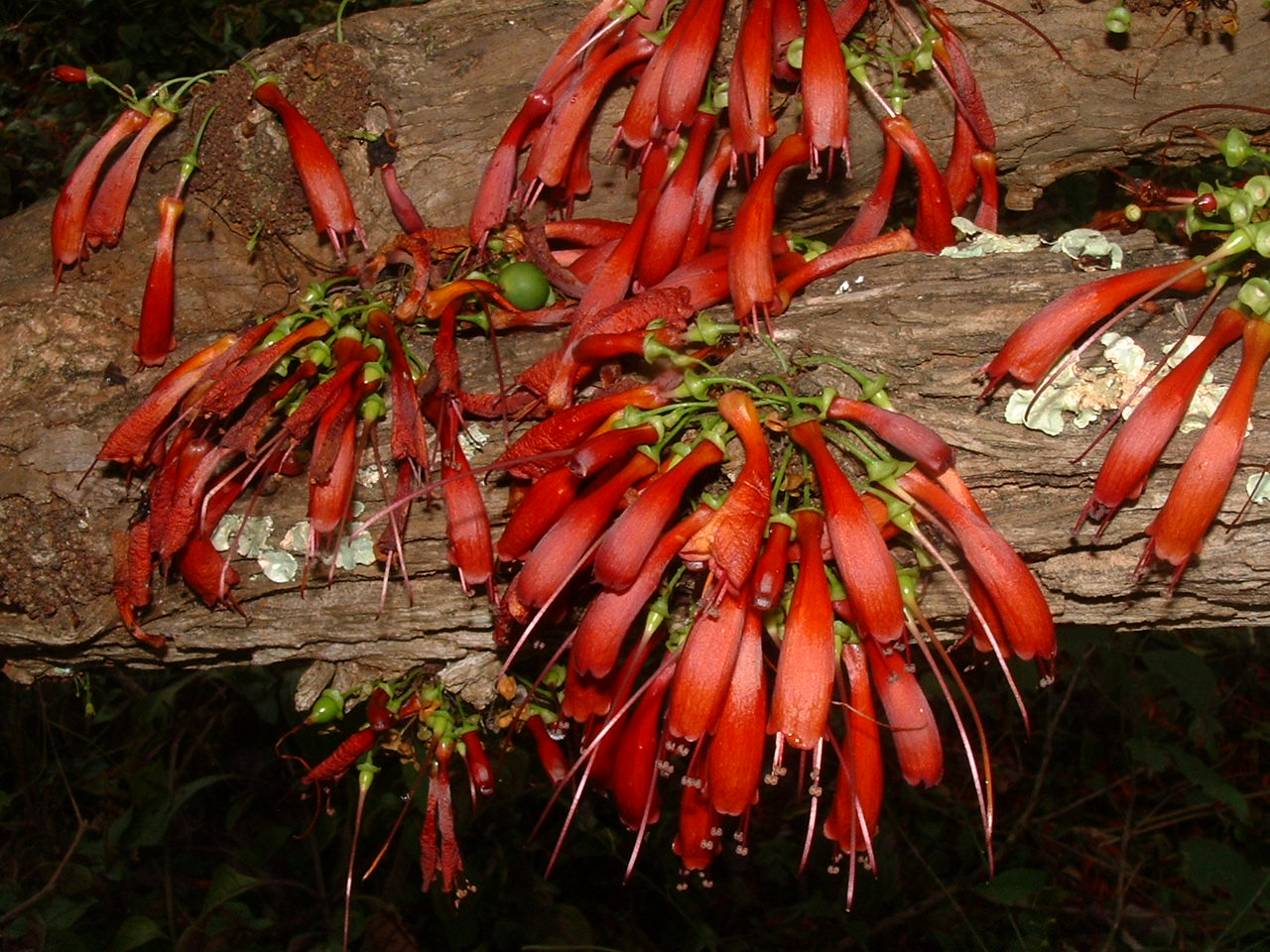
Flowers

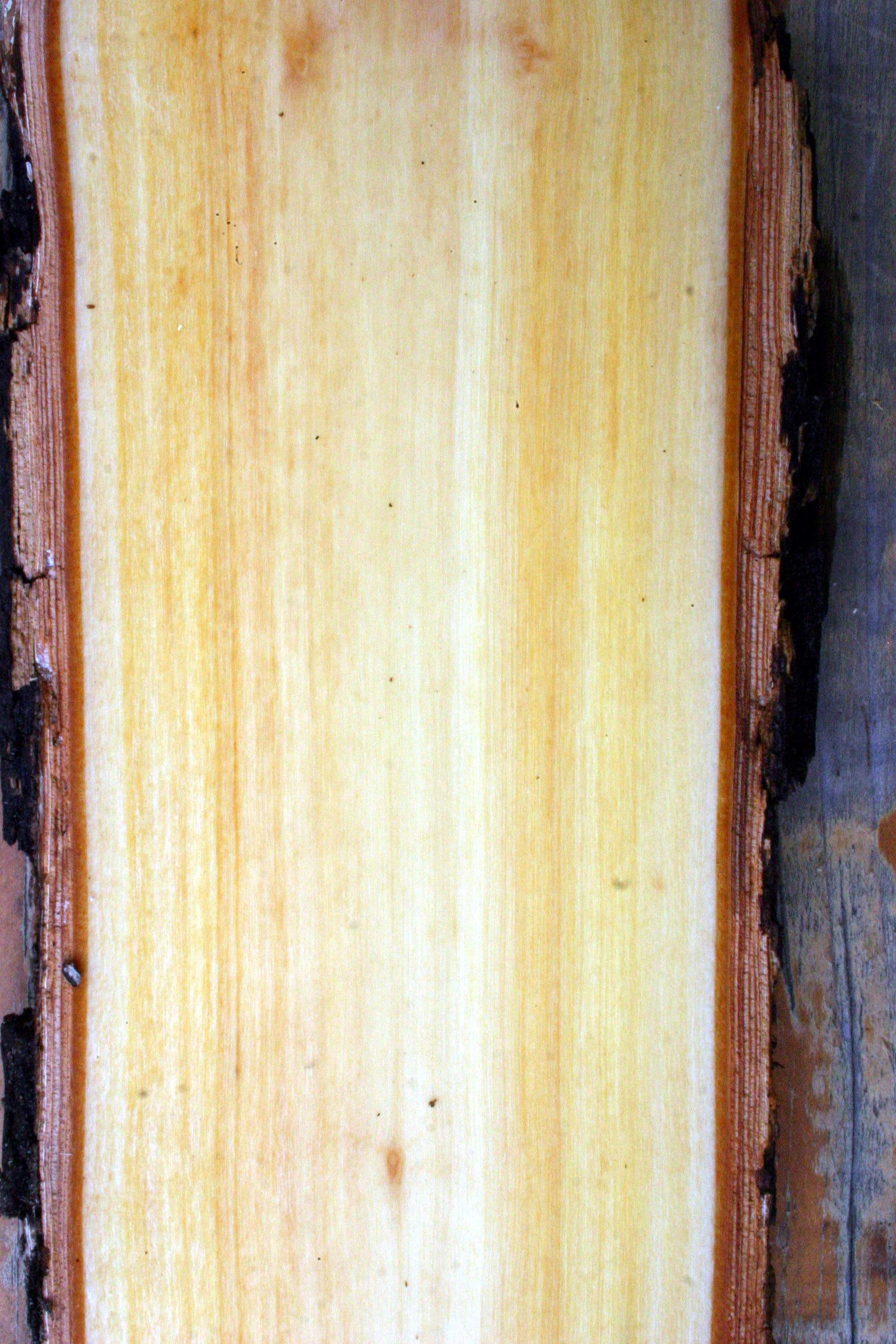
Wood

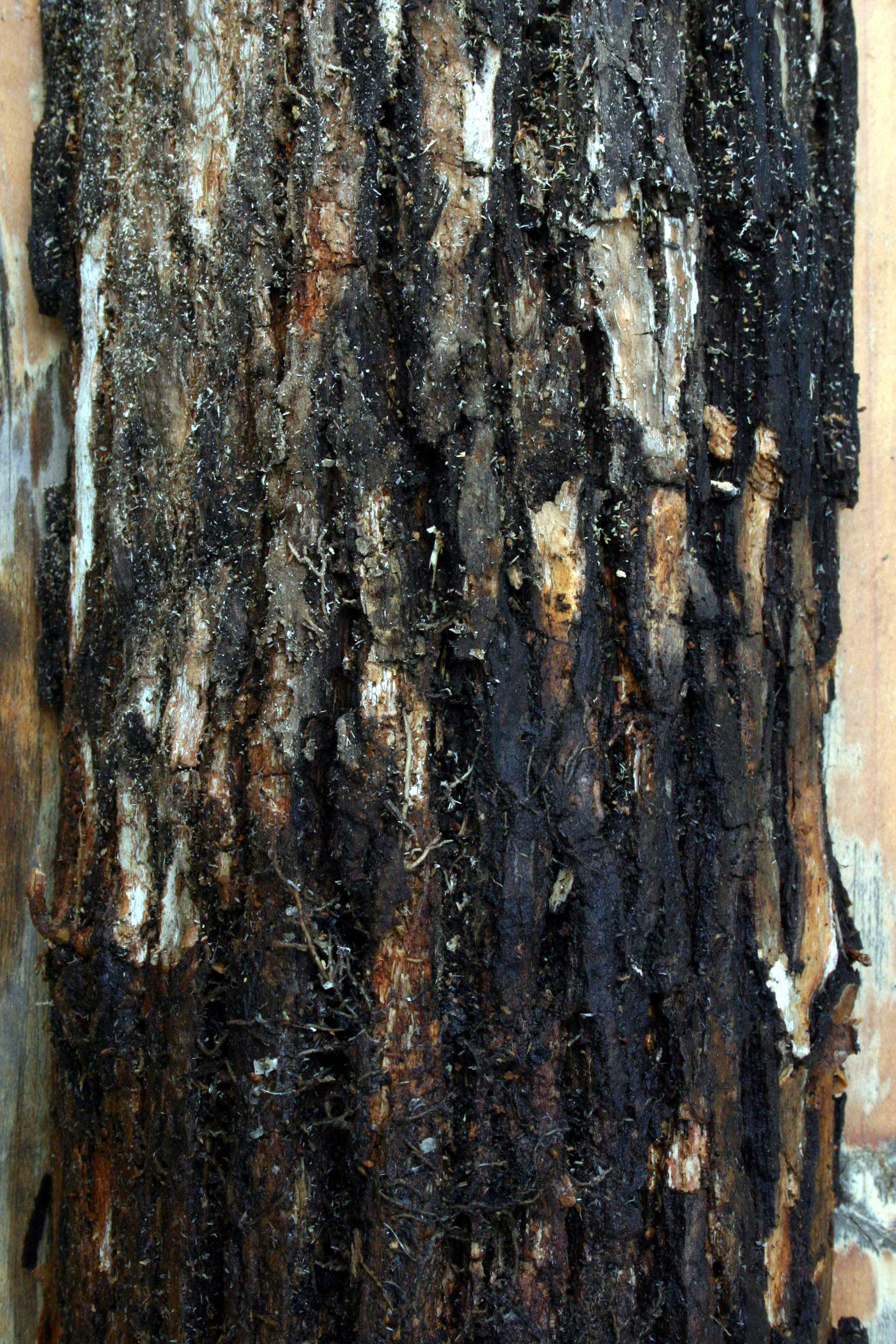
Bark

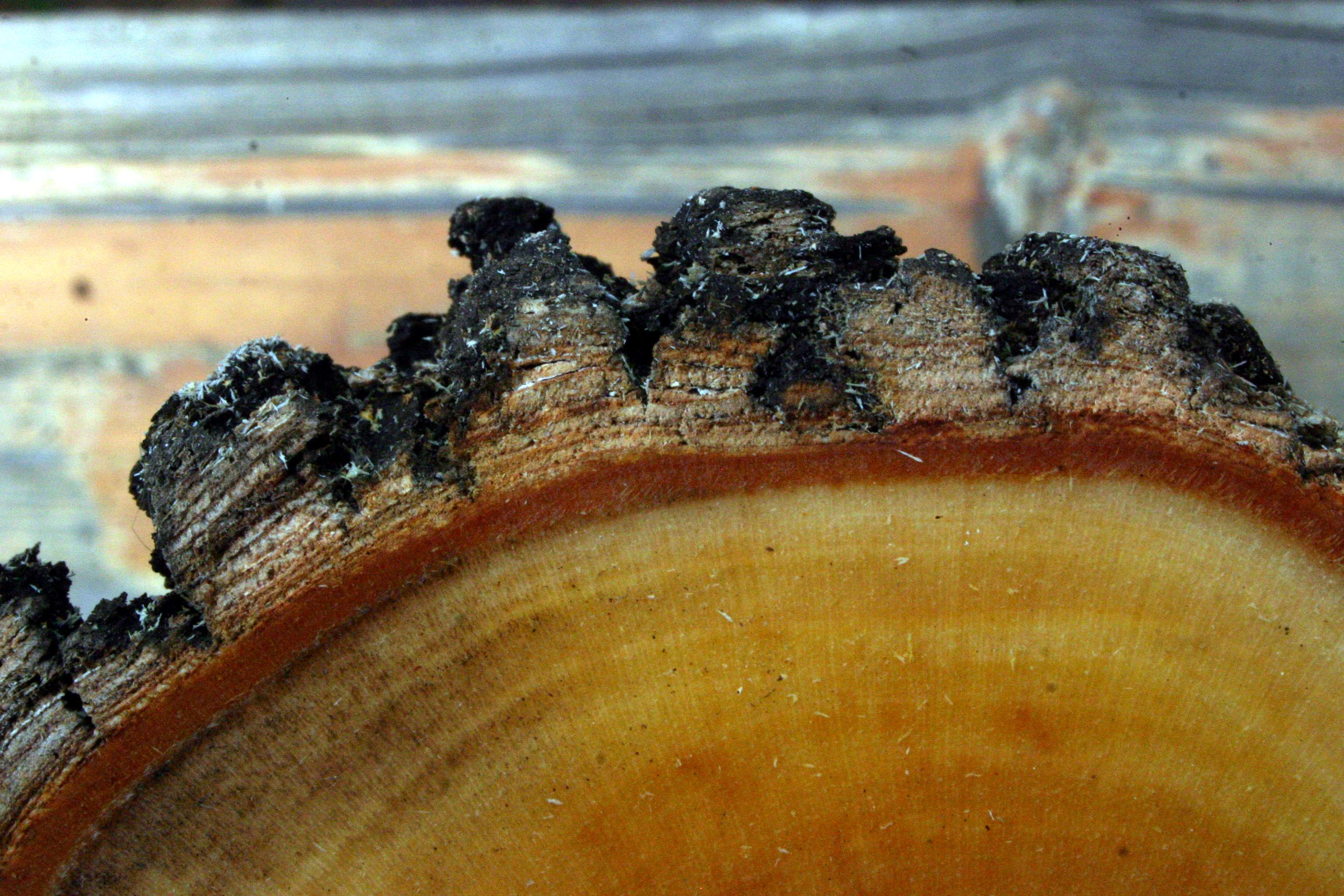
Cross-section
