= Du Bois-Reymond =

Du Bois-Reymond may refer to:

- Emil du Bois-Reymond (1818–1896), German physician and physiologist
- Eveline Du Bois-Reymond Marcus (1901–1990), German zoologist
- Paul du Bois-Reymond (1831–1889), German mathematician

== See also ==
- Dubois (surname)
- Reymond
