= Gesnerus =

Academic journal

- Discipline: History of medicine, History of science
- Language: English, French, German, Italian
- Edited by: Vincent Barras, Hubert Steinke

Publication details
- Former names: Swiss Journal of the History of Medicine and Sciences
- History: 1864–2020
- Publisher: Schwabe Verlag (Switzerland)
- Frequency: Biannual
- Open access: Yes
- License: CC BY-SA 4.0

Standard abbreviations
- ISO 4: Gesnerus

Indexing
- ISSN: 0016-9161 (print); 2297-7953 (web)
- LCCN: 2022204026
- OCLC no.: 956549028

Links
- Journal homepage; Online Archive 1943-2002; Online Archive 2003-2020

Gesnerus was a biannual peer-reviewed academic journal covering the history of medicine and science that was published by the Schwabe Verlag on behalf of the Swiss Society for the History of Medicine and Sciences, of which it was the official journal. It published original articles, book reviews, reports on current developments, and announcements in English, German, French, and Italian. The journal was established in 1864 and published until 2020, when it merged into the European Journal for the History of Medicine and Health.

== Abstracting and indexing ==
The journal was abstracted and indexed in:

- EBSCO databases
- International Bibliography of Periodical Literature
- Mir@bel
- Répertoire International de Littérature Musicale
- Scopus
