= Reymond =

Reymond is a surname. Notable people with the surname include:

- Adolphe Reymond (1896–1976), Swiss footballer
- Arnold Reymond (1874–1958), Swiss philosopher
- Cauã Reymond (born 1980), Brazilian actor
- Emil du Bois-Reymond (1818–1896), German physician and physiologist
- Gabriel Reymond (1923–2021), Swiss racewalker
- Jean Reymond (1912–1992), Monaco politician
- Marcel Reymond (1911–2002), Swiss ski jumper
- Maurice Reymond (1862–1936), Swiss artist
- Paul du Bois-Reymond (1831–1889), German mathematician
- Robert L. Reymond (1932–2013), American theologian

== See also ==
- Villard-Reymond
