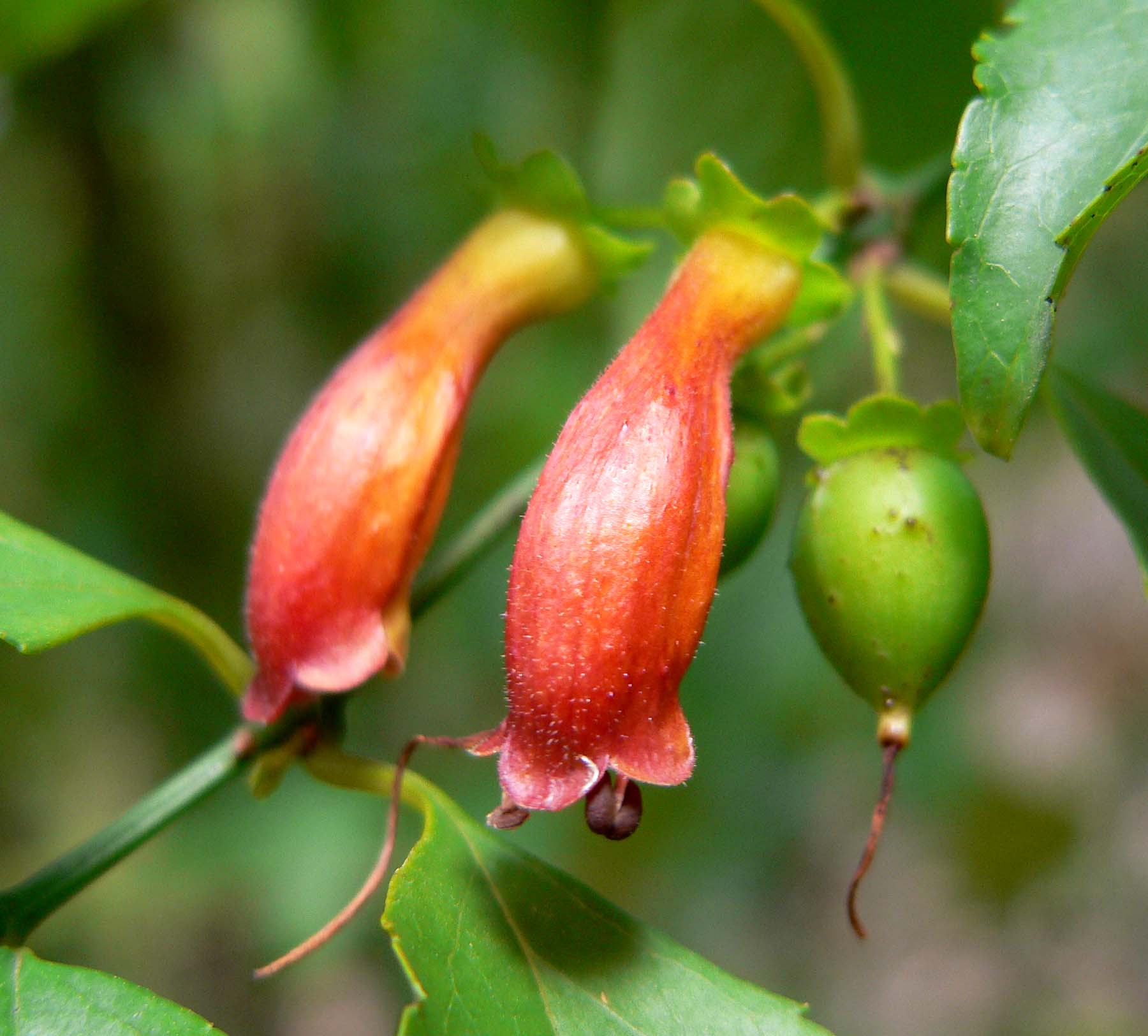
- Halleria lucida

Scientific classification
- Kingdom: Plantae
- Clade: Tracheophytes
- Clade: Angiosperms
- Clade: Eudicots
- Clade: Asterids
- Order: Lamiales
- Family: Stilbaceae
- Genus: Halleria; L.

= Halleria (plant) =

Genus of flowering plants

Halleria is a genus of flowering plants in the family Stilbaceae described as a genus by Linnaeus in the year 1753.

Halleria is native to eastern and southern Africa and to Madagascar.

Species

1. Halleria elliptica L. - South Africa, Malawi
2. Halleria ligustrifolia Baker - Madagascar
3. Halleria lucida L. - South Africa, Malawi, Tanzania, Uganda
4. Halleria ovata Benth. - South Africa
