= Biblioteca europea di informazione e cultura =

Library in Milan

Coordinates: 45.4649°N 9.1892°E

The Biblioteca Europea di Informazione e Cultura (BEIC, "European library of information and culture") is an ongoing project based in Milan, Italy for the realization of a new modern library. It began in the late 1990s, when Antonio Padoa-Schioppa submitted the idea for the first time to the City of Milan and the Italian Ministry of Cultural Heritage and Activities and Tourism. The library is split in two main units: physical and virtual.

== BeicDL ==
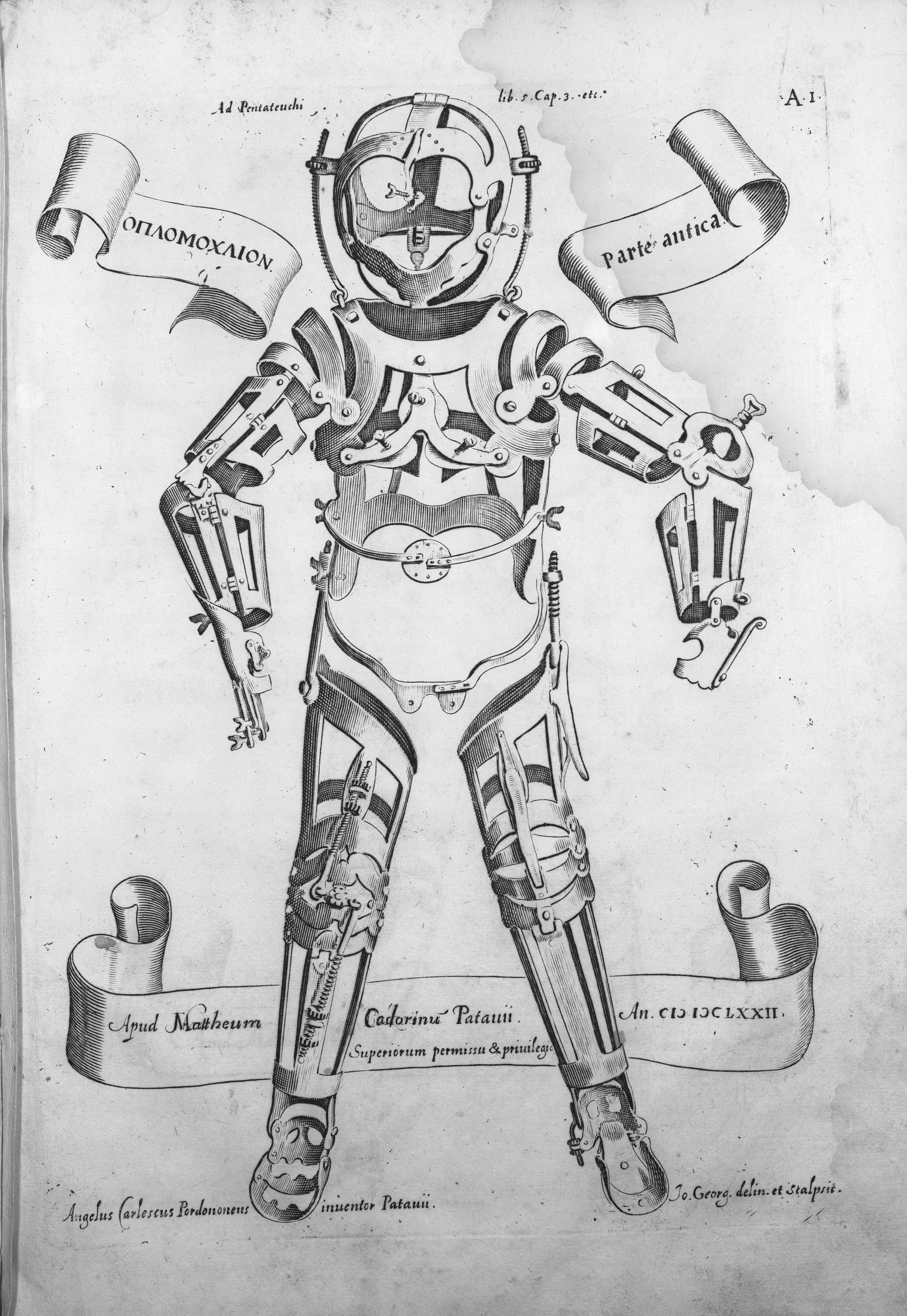
Illustration, engraved by Giovanni Giorgi, from Girolamo Fabricio d'Acquapendente's Operationes chirurgicae (1685) - one of the historical images hosted by BEIC

The BEIC digital library (BeicDL) inauguration took place on 30 November 2012 and it has more than 27.000 digital objects and 3.000 authors. The items are articulated in semantic collections and are freely accessible through the web.

== Archive of the Regional legal deposit of Lombardy ==
According to Italian Law 106 of 15 April 2004 all the Italian Region must collect all the items submitted for legal deposit. Lombardy Region has entrusted the management of its Archive of Published Documents to BEIC, with the support of the Biblioteca Nazionale Braidense of Milan. The Archive has its own online public access catalogue.

== Paolo Monti Archive ==
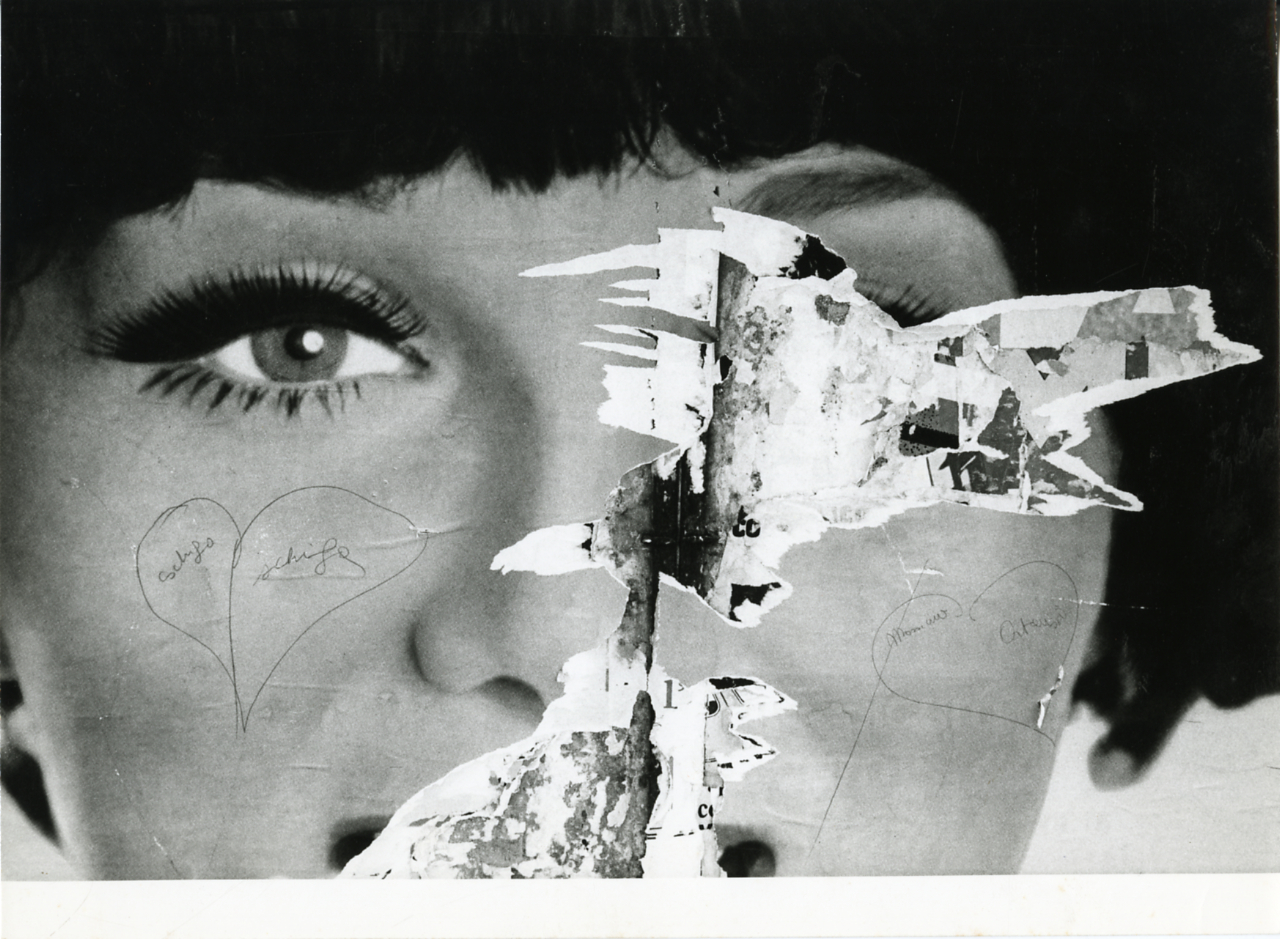
Image from Paolo Monti's Serie fotografica (Venezia, 1971), released under an open licence by BEIC

In 2008 BEIC acquired the whole Paolo Monti Archive, declared of notable historical interest in the Italian Ministry of Cultural Heritage and Activities. The Archive—counting more than 223,000 negatives, 12,244 prints, and 790 chemigrams⁣—has been catalogued and opened to the public.
