= George Forster (murderer) =

British murderer (??–1803)

George Forster (or Foster) was found guilty of murdering his wife and child by drowning them in Paddington Canal, London. He was hanged at Newgate on 18 January 1803, shortly after which his body was taken to a nearby house where it was used in an experiment by Italian scientist Giovanni Aldini.

== Trial ==
At his trial the events were reconstructed. Forster's mother-in-law recounted that her daughter and grandchild had left her house to see Forster at 4 p.m. on Saturday, 4 December 1802. Joseph Bradfield, in whose house Forster lodged, reported that they had stayed together that night and gone out at 10 a.m. on the Sunday morning. He also stated that Forster and his wife had not been on good terms because she wished to live with him. Various witnesses saw Forster with his wife and child in public houses near Paddington Canal during the day on the Sunday. The body of his child was found on the Monday morning; after the canal was dragged for three days, his wife's body was also found.

Forster claimed that upon leaving The Mitre he set out alone for Barnet in order to see his other two children who were in the workhouse there, though he was forced to turn back at Whetstone due to the failing light. This was contradicted by a waiter at The Mitre who said the three left the inn together. Scepticism was also expressed that he could have walked to Whetstone in the time he claimed. The jury found him guilty. He was sentenced to death and also to be dissected thereafter. This sentence was designed not only to provide medicine with corpses on which to experiment, but also to ensure that the condemned could not rise on Judgement Day, their bodies having been cut into pieces and selectively discarded. Forster was hanged on 18 January, shortly before which he made a full confession. He said he had come to hate his wife and had twice before taken his wife to the canal but his nerve had both times failed him.

== Later investigations ==
A recent BBC Knowledge documentary (Real Horror: Frankenstein) questions the fairness of the trial. It notes that friends of George Forster's wife later claimed that she was extremely suicidal and had often talked about killing herself and her daughter. According to this documentary, Forster attempted suicide by stabbing himself with a crudely fashioned knife. This was to avoid awakening during the dissection of his body, should he not have died when hanged. This was a real possibility owing to the crude methods of execution at the time. The same reference suggests that his 'confession' was obtained under duress. In fact, it alleges that Pass, a Beadle on Aldini's payroll, fast-tracked the whole trial and legal procedure in order to obtain the freshest corpse possible for his benefactor.

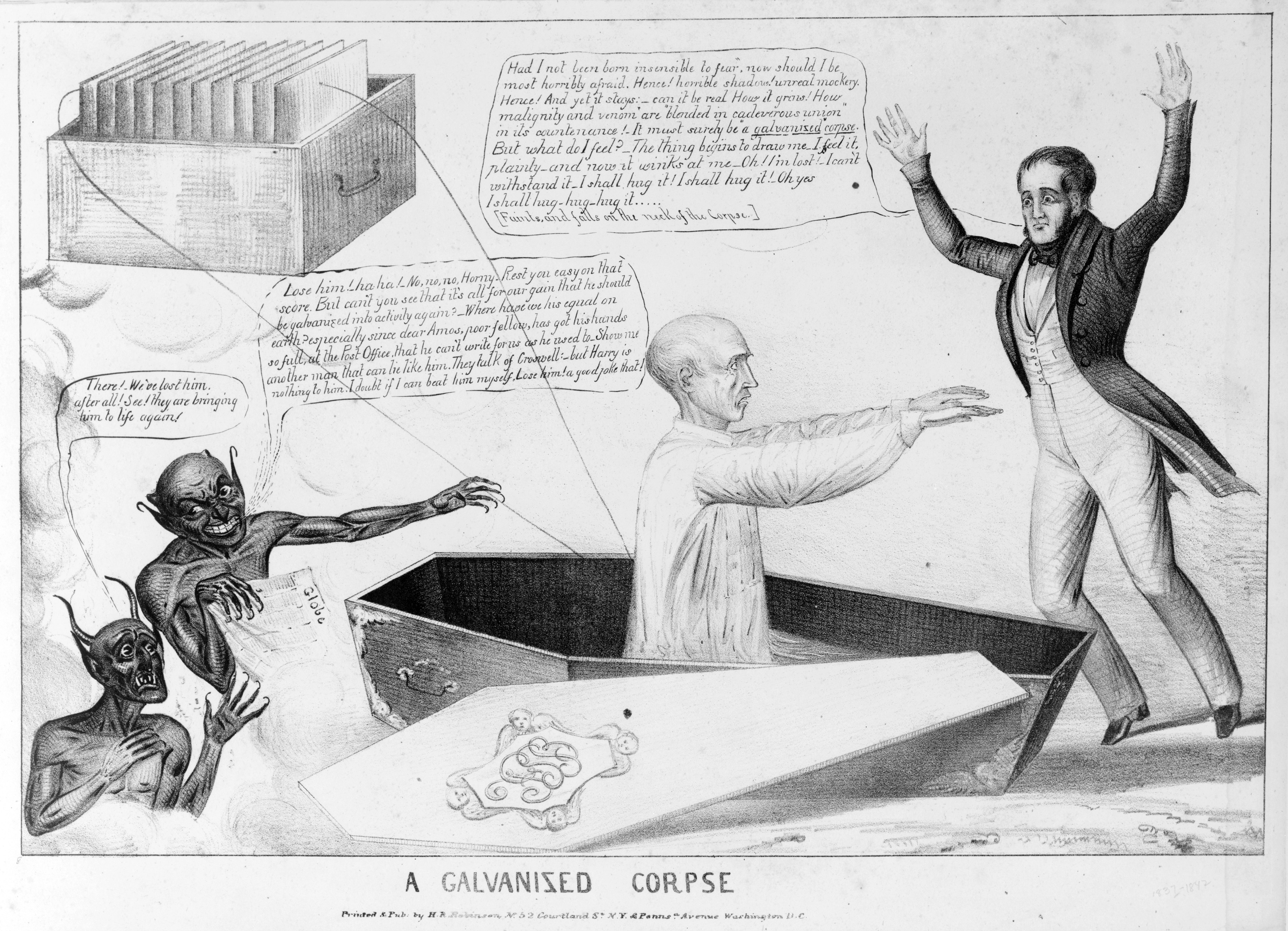
An illustration of a galvanised corpse

After the execution Forster's body was given to Giovanni Aldini for experimentation. Aldini was the nephew of fellow scientist Luigi Galvani and an enthusiastic proponent of his uncle's method of stimulating muscles with electric current, known as Galvanism. The experiment he performed on Forster's body was a demonstration of this technique. The Newgate Calendar (a record of executions at Newgate) reports that, "On the first application of the process to the face, the jaws of the deceased criminal began to quiver, and the adjoining muscles were horribly contorted, and one eye was actually opened. In the subsequent part of the process the right hand was raised and clenched, and the legs and thighs were set in motion."

Several of those present believed that Forster was being brought back to life (The Newgate Calendar reports that even if this had been so, he would have been re-executed since his sentence was to "hang until he be dead") and one man, Mr Pass, the beadle of the Surgeons' Company, was so shocked that he died shortly after leaving. The hanged man was certainly dead, since his blood had been drained and his spinal cord severed after the execution.

== Media ==
- The Galvanism experiment performed on George Forster was explored in the Science Channel's Dark Matters: Twisted But True.
- George Forster was noted on History Channel show called, Zombies: A Living History
