= Journal of Neurology =

- Discipline: Neurology
- Language: English
- Edited by: R.A. Barker, M. Filippi, M. Strupp

Publication details
- Former name(s): Deutsche Zeitschrift für Nervenheilkunde, Zeitschrift für Neurologie
- History: 1891-present
- Publisher: Springer Science+Business Media
- Frequency: Monthly
- Open access: Hybrid open access
- Impact factor: 3.783 (2017)

Standard abbreviations
- ISO 4: J. Neurol.

Indexing
- CODEN: JNRYA9
- ISSN: 0340-5354 (print); 1432-1459 (web)
- OCLC no.: 00938795

Links
- Journal homepage; Online access

The Journal of Neurology is a peer-reviewed medical journal covering research on diseases of the nervous system. It was established in 1891 as the Deutsche Zeitschrift für Nervenheilkunde and was renamed to Zeitschrift für Neurologie in 1947. It obtained its current title in 1971. Publication was interrupted in 1945 and 1946.
