= Sugar battery =

Type of disposable battery

A sugar battery is an emerging type of biobattery that is fueled by maltodextrin and facilitated by the enzymatic catalysts.

The sugar battery generates electric current by the oxidation of the glucose unit of maltodextrin. The oxidation of the organic compound produces carbon dioxide and electrical current. 13 types of enzymes are planted in the battery so that the reaction goes to completion and converts most chemical energy into electrical energy. The experimental results have shown that the sugar battery of the same mass can store at least two times, up to ten times electrical energy than the traditional lithium-ion battery can. The sugar battery is expected to be the next general type of mobile electric power source and the possible power source for electric cars. But the sugar battery's output voltage (0.5V) is lower than that of the lithium-ion battery (3.6 V), which causes its electric power (the rate of electrical energy transfer) to be low.

Sony, a Japanese corporation, first published the theory of sugar battery in 2007. A research team led by Dr. Y.H. Percival Zhang at Virginia Tech provided the latest version of it in 2014.

== History ==
Sony, a Japanese corporation, first published the theory of sugar battery in 2007. This type of sugar battery is air-breathing and utilizes the oxygen as the oxidizing agent. The battery achieved expected high energy density and reasonable output voltage. Then the company shifted its researching direction in 2012 to the paper battery, which uses paper as fuel. After 2013, Sony didn't release more information about their research project on the biobattery.

A research team led by Dr. Y.H. Percival Zhang at Virginia Tech started the project of the sugar battery in 2009. The team first focused on the connection with the hydrogen economy. In 2014, they published their research on the sugar battery that utilizes enzymes in oxidization. This type of sugar battery reached a high energy density. The sugar battery was expected to be realized in an application in 3 years.

In 2017, Dr. Y.H. Percival Zhang was arrested by the FBI (has been released in 2019). The federal government accused Dr. Zhang of over twenty counts. Dr. Zhang then resigned from his position at Virginia Tech. Since then, Virginia Tech stopped publishing the result of the sugar battery study.

In 2019, Dr. Zhang was acquitted of 19 counts but found guilty of conspiring to commit federal grant fraud.

Since 2014, Several Chinese universities, including Zhejiang University and Tianjin University, started working on researches on the sugar battery.

== Potential benefits ==
Compared to the currently widely used lithium-ion battery, the sugar battery has potential benefits in many aspects.

=== Safety ===
Compared to the traditional lithium-ion battery, sugar battery does not require toxic metals in manufacturing and releases only carbon dioxide gases. The production of the standard lithium-ion battery would require several metals, including but not limited to lead (Pb), Cadmium (Cd), and Chromium (Cr). The leakage of these metals accumulates inside the vegetables and animals that humans depend on and finally reach humans. Besides, overheating may cause the lithium-ion battery to release up to 100 types of harmful gases to the human body. In some instances, the rechargeable lithium-ion battery explodes to cause a physical casualty.

=== Availability of fuel ===
The primary fuel of the sugar battery, maltodextrin, can be enzymatically derived from any starch, such as corn and wheat. Therefore, maltodextrin is renewable. In contrast, the primary constructing block of the lithium battery, lithium carbide, is an unrenewable compound that occurs naturally in the earth. To obtain it, manufacturers need to mine, extract, and purify.

=== Environmental friendliness ===
The products of oxidation reaction inside the sugar battery are mainly water, carbon dioxide, and recyclable adenosine triphosphate (ATP). Whereas the disposal of lithium batteries produces heavy metals that contaminate the soil. According to the field experiments, several vegetable species extract the heavy metals from soil and store concentrated metals inside. The carbon dioxide produced by the sugar battery does not contribute to the crisis of greenhouse gas, because the sugar battery uses bio-fuel that is carbon-neutral. Since the production of the fuels involves the photosynthesis of plants, which removes carbon dioxide from the atmosphere, the new greenhouse gas released is counted as a net-zero carbon footprint.

=== High energy density ===
The complete oxidation reaction of unit glucose in 15% maltodextrin solution enables the sugar battery to have an energy density of 596 Ah kg^{−1}, which is over twice as high as that of the widely used lithium-ion battery(~270 Ah kg^{−1}). In application, this means that the lifetime of the battery increases. Alternatively, the mass and volume of the battery reduce.

== Drawbacks ==
As a newly invented idea, the sugar battery is not well developed yet. It has several drawbacks in the current state.

=== Relatively low voltage ===
Though the output voltage of sugar battery (0.5 V) exceeds that of former enzymatic fuel batteries by the use of various enzymatic catalysts, it is still much lower than that of the commonly used lithium-ion battery (3.6 V). That results in low electric power. In application, it means that the sugar battery takes more time to charge the appliance than the lithium-ion battery does.

=== Water requirement ===
The production of the fuel of the sugar battery and the reaction inside the sugar battery require water to complete. If the battery is going to be used widely around the world, it will undoubtedly require a considerable amount of water. Under current conditions, widespread use will further intensify water scarcity.

== Design ==
The design of the sugar battery is based on the theory of the primary cell. The main components of a sugar battery are an anode, a cathode, a membrane, and a synthetic pathway. The oxidation reaction happens in the anode side where the fuel, maltodextrin, is oxidized. Electrons are released from the fuel and go through the wire connected to the cathode, forming a direct electrical current. Electrical appliances are installed between anode and cathode so that the electrical current powers the appliance.

=== Anode ===
The redox reaction that produces the electrical current happens in the synthetic pathway, where 13 enzymes, such as glucose 6-phosphate and phosphoglucomutase, act as catalysts (the substance that is both reactant and product). The fuel, maltodextrin, is divided from polymer to monomer and then oxidized into carbon dioxide and hydrogen ions during four reactions. The reactions involve the enzymatic catalysts, but since they act both as reactant and product, the amount of the enzymes does not decrease in the end so that they can keep facilitating the reaction. At the end of the reaction, One glucose unit and a certain amount of water can produce 24 electrons. The electrons then flow to the cathode through the wire, causing an electrical current flowing from cathode to anode.

=== Synthetic pathway ===
The synthetic pathway is composed of 13 enzymes to ensure the redox reaction goes into completion (that is, 24 electrons produced per glucose unit). By adding all these catalytic enzymes into the pathway, the overall chemical equation goes as:

$\ce{C6H10O5 + 7H2O ->24e- + 6CO2 + 24H+}$

Theoretically, one maltodextrin's glucose unit (C_{_{6}}H_{_{10}}O_{_{5}}) generates 24 electrons, which makes the sugar battery's maximum current density 35% higher than the maximum current density of a similar system based on 2 dehydrogenases. Practically, the researchers at Virginia Tech measures the faraday efficiency (the percent of measured output against theoretical output) of the sugar battery's redox reaction. The outcome was 97.6±3.0% under oxygen-free conditions for the anode compartment, suggesting high efficiency in the electron transmission.

Different from the natural pathway, which utilizes NADP (nicotinamide adenine dinucleotide phosphate)-dependent enzyme, the synthetic pathway makes use of the other cytosolic enzymes to mediate the reaction. As a result, the sugar battery does not depend on the use of complex organic chemicals (for example, adenosine triphosphate), which are expensive and unstable.

== Improvements ==
The researchers developed the design of the sugar battery from the prototyped enzymatic fuel cells, which use enzymes as catalysts in the redox reaction. Based on the design of regular enzymatic fuel cells, the sugar battery employs several methods to enlarge the effect produced by the enzymes so that the overall efficiency of the battery is improved.

=== Non-immobilized enzymes ===
The enzymes in sugar battery are no more fixed to the electrode, nor entrapped in a limited space near the electrode. The enzymes in the sugar battery can move freely in a larger space and retain the enzymatic activity. To sustain high-speed mass transfer, the researchers immobilized vitamin K3 to the electrode. The corresponding experiments suggest that the non-immobilization method helps the sugar battery to reach a higher and more stable energy density level than the regular enzyme fuel cells with immobilized enzymes. Hence, the energy density of the sugar battery increased so that the battery life extended.

=== Thermo Enzymes ===
Thermoenzymes, enzymes with high thermostability, are used as the non-immobilized enzymes to ensure stability. In the sugar battery, the thermo enzymes are produced by Escherichia coli. Then the enzymes are purified through heat precipitation method and put into use.

=== Synthetic catabolic pathway ===
The oxidation reaction inside the sugar battery happens in a synthetic catabolic pathway, which contains 13 enzymes. This pathway is constructed as air-breathing rather than closed so that the researchers ensure the air pressure inside the battery stable and the oxidation reaction goes into completion. The enzymes act as catalysts so that the total amount of them remains the same. Therefore, the overall reaction consumes only the fuel and water while the enzymes recycle in the system. According to the lab experiments, the sugar battery reaches an electron-transmission efficiency of almost 24 electrons per monomer glucose, which is the basic unit of organic fuels. In comparison, the oxidation reaction in the prototyped enzymatic fuel cells could only generate 2 electrons per glucose unit, resulting in low energy density.

== See also ==
- Lithium-ion battery
- Biobattery
- List of battery types
- Paper battery
- Enzymatic biofuel cell
