= Biofuel cell =

A biofuel cell uses living organisms to produce electricity. It may refer to:

- Microbial fuel cell, a bio-electrochemical system that drives a current by using bacteria and mimicking bacterial interactions found in nature
- Enzymatic biofuel cell, a type of fuel cell that uses enzymes rather than precious metals as a catalyst to oxidize its fuel

== See also ==
- Biobattery
