= Pablo M. Vidarte =

Spanish inventor

Pablo M. Vidarte is a Spanish inventor and president of Arkyne Technologies founder of Bioo, Arkyne's leading project for the generation of electricity from natural systems through biological batteries.

== Career ==
Pablo Vidarte developed research on external combustion engines in parallel with studies carried out by NASA. He was a finalist in the national innovation award and appeared on the first European Summit of the Singularity University, created by Google and NASA, in 2013 in Budapest, Hungary.

=== Arkyne Technologies ===
On October 27, 2015, Pablo Vidarte founded the technology company Arkyne Technologies. The company's objective was to serve as a legal vehicle for the development of technological products from their development to their production. The company's first project was called Geoo, within the geolocation device industry. The project was launched with a successful prototype, but was later changed by a rapid and abrupt growth of large companies in the sector and a recent invention to generate electricity from natural systems through biological batteries outside. This concept, developed by the company, pivoted its business model. After a period of early development, Pablo Vidarte, and the rest of the members of the entity at that time, decided to call the project Bioo , being their first biotechnology company.

=== Bioo ===
In 2016, Pablo founded Bioo, as a project for the development of applied biotechnologies, such as the generation of electricity from natural ecosystems. Based on research around the world related to microbial fuel cell technology applied to water treatments, Vidarte and his team developed a series of biological reactor prototypes. These were capable of obtaining energy from the organic decomposition of carbon -based substances found in the substrate of natural areas, without harming any living being in the process. The company's first hurdle was the ability to replicate these bio-based batteries in industrial volumes after having to stop shipping its first product concepts. These early reactors required high maintenance and were only capable of being produced individually after prior laboratory development. Vidarte and his team made a first round of financing focused on the development of the standardization of an industrial replication model of their reactors.

== Philosophy and work ==
Vidarte was the writer of the book: "A New Earth. He who lived a thousand lives", and the creator of the Transcentist movement, a philanthropic philosophy based on the future advances of society. Vidarte's philosophy is based on current physics, as well as biology and sociological behaviors on an expanded time scale.

== Awards and recognitions ==
- Top of the list of the Top 50 of the most innovative companies in Europe: European Parliament, Brussels, 2017.
- Forbes List, "30 Under 30" Europe Edition: Forbes, London, 2017.
- Award from the American Chamber of Commerce in Europe. Brussels, 2018.
- First Prize of "Connect Visions to Solutions": German Chamber of Commerce and Industry. Prague, 2017.
- "Spark-life 2017" Award, London, 2017.
- Forbes List, "30 Under 30" Spain: Forbes, Madrid, 2017.
- Most Disruptive Startup of the Year: Google Inc., South Summit, 2016.
- First Prize in Imagine Express: Imagine Foundation; Imagine C. Center, London, 2016.
- National Company, First Prize: VIII SP InterUniversity Award, Madrid, 2016.
- Madrid & Ja-Ye Europe Science Park Award, Madrid, 2016.
- First Place in Energy and Industry: South Summit, Madrid, 2016.
- Manuel Arroyo Award; Barcelona, 2015.
- Best Business Initiative in Catalonia: Barcelona City Council & Aijec, Barcelona, 2015.
