= Frog galvanoscope =

Instrument for detecting voltage

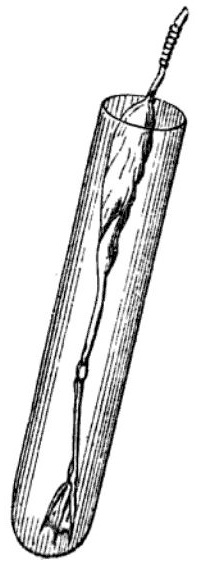
Frog's-leg galvanoscope

The frog galvanoscope was a sensitive electrical instrument used to detect voltage in the late 18th and 19th centuries. It consists of a skinned frog's leg with electrical connections to a nerve. The instrument was invented by Luigi Galvani and improved by Carlo Matteucci.

The frog galvanoscope, and other experiments with frogs, played a part in the dispute between Galvani and Alessandro Volta over the nature of electricity. The instrument is extremely sensitive and continued to be used well into the nineteenth century, even after electromechanical meters came into use.

== Terminology ==
Synonyms for this device include galvanoscopic frog, frog's leg galvanoscope, frog galvanometer, rheoscopic frog, and frog electroscope. The device is properly called a galvanoscope rather than galvanometer since the latter implies accurate measurement whereas a galvanoscope only gives an indication. In modern usage a galvanometer is a sensitive laboratory instrument for measuring current, not voltage. Everyday current meters for use in the field are called ammeters. A similar distinction can be made between electroscopes, electrometers, and voltmeters for voltage measurements.

== History ==
Frogs were a popular subject of experiment in the laboratories of early scientists. They were small, easily handled, and there was a ready supply. Marcello Malpighi, for instance, used frogs in his study of lungs in the seventeenth century. Frogs were particularly suitable for the study of muscle activity. Especially in the legs, the muscle contractions are readily observed and the nerves are easily dissected out. Another desirable feature for scientists was that these contractions continued after death for a considerable time. Also in the eighteenth century, Leopoldo Caldani and Felice Fontana subjected frogs to electric shocks to test Albrecht von Haller's irritability theory.

Luigi Galvani, a lecturer at the University of Bologna, was researching the nervous system of frogs from around 1780. This research included the muscular response to opiates and static electricity, for which experiments the spinal cord and rear legs of a frog were dissected out together and the skin removed. In 1781, an observation was made while a frog was being dissected. An electric machine discharged just at the moment one of Galvani's assistants touched the crural nerve of a dissected frog with a scalpel. The frog's legs twitched as the discharge happened. Galvani found that he could make the prepared leg of a frog (see the Construction section) twitch by connecting a metal circuit from a nerve to a muscle, thus inventing the first frog galvanoscope. Galvani published these results in 1791 in De viribus electricitatis.

An alternative version of the story of the frog response at a distance has the frogs being prepared for a soup on the same table as a running electric machine. Galvani's wife noticed the frog twitch when an assistant accidentally touched a nerve and reported the phenomenon to her husband. This story originates with Jean-Louis Alibert and, according to Piccolino and Bresadola, was probably invented by him.

Galvani, and his nephew Giovanni Aldini, used the frog galvanoscope in their electrical experiments. Carlo Matteucci improved the instrument and brought it to wider attention. Galvani used the frog galvanoscope to investigate and promote the theory of animal electricity, that is, that there was a vital life force in living things that manifested itself as a new kind of electricity. Alessandro Volta opposed this theory, believing that the electricity that Galvani and other proponents were witnessing was due to metal contact electrification in the circuit. Volta's motivation in inventing the voltaic pile (the forerunner of the common zinc–carbon battery) was largely to enable him to construct a circuit entirely with non-biological material to show that the vital force was not necessary to produce the electrical effects seen in animal experiments. Matteucci, in answer to Volta, and to show that metal contacts were not necessary, constructed a circuit entirely out of biological material, including a frog battery. Neither the animal electricity theory of Galvani nor the contact electrification theory of Volta forms part of modern electrical science. However, Alan Hodgkin in the 1930s showed that there is indeed an ionic current flowing in nerves.

Matteucci used the frog galvanoscope to study the relationship of electricity to muscles, including in freshly amputated human limbs. Matteucci concluded from his measurements that there was an electric current continually flowing from the interior, to the exterior of all muscles. Matteucci's idea was widely accepted by his contemporaries, but this is no longer believed and his results are now explained in terms of injury potential.

== Construction ==
An entire frog's hind leg is removed from the frog's body with the sciatic nerve still attached, and possibly also a portion of the spinal cord. The leg is skinned, and two electrical connections are made. These may be made to the nerve and the foot of the frog's leg by wrapping them with metal wire or foil, but a more convenient instrument is Matteucci's arrangement shown in the image. The leg is placed in a glass tube with just the nerve protruding. Connection is made to two different points on the nerve.

According to Matteucci, the instrument is most accurate if direct electrical contact with muscle is avoided. That is, connections are made only to the nerve. Matteucci also advises that the nerve should be well stripped and that contacts to it can be made with wet paper in order to avoid using sharp metal probes directly on the nerve.

== Operation ==
When the frog's leg is connected to a circuit with an electric potential, the muscles will contract and the leg will twitch briefly. It will twitch again when the circuit is broken. The instrument is capable of detecting extremely small voltages, and could far surpass other instruments available in the first half of the nineteenth century, including the electromagnetic galvanometer and the gold-leaf electroscope. For this reason, it remained popular long after other instruments became available. The galvanometer was made possible in 1820 by the discovery by Hans Christian Ørsted that electric currents would deflect a compass needle, and the gold-leaf electroscope was even earlier (Abraham Bennet, 1786). Yet Golding Bird could still write in 1848 that "the irritable muscles of a frog's legs were no less than 56,000 times more delicate a test of electricity than the most sensitive condensing electrometer." The word condenser used by Bird here means a coil, so named by Johann Poggendorff by analogy with Volta's term for a capacitor.

The frog galvanoscope can be used to detect the direction of electric current. A frog's leg that has been somewhat desensitised is needed for this. The sensitivity of the instrument is greatest with a freshly prepared leg and then falls off with time, so an older leg is best for this. The response of the leg is greater to currents in one direction than the other and with a suitably desensitised leg it may only respond to currents in one direction. For a current going into the leg from the nerve, the leg will twitch on making the circuit. For a current passing out of the leg, it will twitch on breaking the circuit.

The major drawback of the frog galvanoscope is that the frog leg frequently needs replacing. The leg will continue to respond for up to 44 hours, but after that a fresh one must be prepared.

== Bibliography ==
- Clarke, Edwin; Jacyna, L. S., Nineteenth-Century Origins of Neuroscientific Concepts, University of California Press, 1992 ISBN 0520078799.
- Clarke, Edwin; O'Malley, Charles Donald, The Human Brain and Spinal Cord: a historical study illustrated by writings from antiquity to the twentieth century, Norman Publishing, 1996 ISBN 0930405250.
- Bird, Golding, Chapter XX, "Physiological electricity, or galvanism", Elements of Natural Philosophy, London: John Churchill, 1848 OCLC 931247166.
- Hackmann, Willem D., "Galvanometer", in Bud, Robert; Warner, Deborah Jean (eds), Instruments of Science: An Historical Encyclopedia, pp. 257–259, Taylor & Francis, 1998 ISBN 0815315619.
- Hare, Robert, "Of galvanism, or voltaic electricity", A Brief Exposition of the Science of Mechanical Electricity, Philadelphia: J. G. Auner, 1840 OCLC 8205588.
- Hellman, Hal, Great Feuds in Medicine, John Wiley and Sons, 2001 ISBN 0471347574
- Keithley, Joseph F., The Story of Electrical and Magnetic Measurements: From 500 BC to the 1940s, IEEE Press, 1999 ISBN 0780311930.
- Piccolino, Marco; Bresadola, Marco, Shocking Frogs: Galvani, Volta, and the Electric Origins of Neuroscience, Oxford University Press, 2013 ISBN 0199782164.
- Matteucci, Carlo "The muscular current" Philosophical Transactions, pp. 283–295, 1845.
- Wilkinson, Charles Henry, Elements of Galvanism, London: John Murray, 1804 OCLC 8497530.
