= Frog battery =

Obsolete electrochemical battery using dead frogs

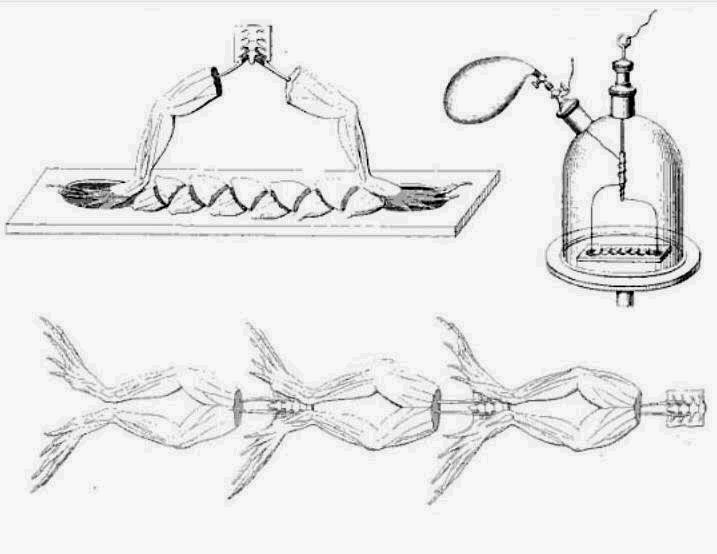
Matteucci's frog battery, 1845 (top left); Aldini's frog battery, 1818 (bottom); apparatus for controlled exposure of gases to frog battery (top right).

A frog battery is an electrochemical battery consisting of a number of dead frogs (or sometimes live ones), which form the cells of the battery connected in a series arrangement. It is a kind of biobattery. It was used in early scientific investigations of electricity and academic demonstrations.

The principle behind the battery is the injury potential created in a muscle when it is damaged, although this was not fully understood in the 18th and 19th centuries; the potential being caused incidentally due to the dissection of the frog's muscles.

The frog battery is an example of a class of biobatteries which can be made from any number of animals. The general term for an example of this class is muscular pile.

The first well-known frog battery was created by Carlo Matteucci in 1845, but there had been others before him. Matteucci also created batteries out of other animals, and Giovanni Aldini created a battery from ox heads.

== Background ==
In the early days of electrical research, a common method of detecting electric current was by means of a frog's leg galvanoscope. A good supply of live frogs was kept on hand by the researcher ready to have their legs prepared for the galvanoscope. Frogs were therefore a convenient material to use in other experiments. They were small, easily handled, the legs were especially sensitive to electric current, and they carried on responding longer than other animal candidates for this role.

== Preparation ==
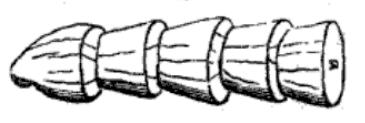
Frog half-thighs in series

It was usual to use the thighs of frogs for the battery construction. The legs of the frog were first skinned, then the lower leg was cut off at the knee joint and discarded. Damaging the muscle during this procedure would detract from the results. The thigh muscle was then cut in two transversely to produce two half-thighs. Only the lower, conical shaped piece was kept. The half-thighs were then laid on an insulator of varnished wood so arranged that the inside surface of one was in contact with the outside surface of the next, with the conical ends of the outside surface being pushed into the cavity of the cut surface. The ends of the pile were placed in cups of water sunk into the wood and formed the terminals of the battery.

The arrangement of inside surface connected to outside surface was on the basis of the incorrect theory that there was an electric current in muscles continually flowing from the inside to the outside. It is now known that the half-thighs were more successful at generating electricity because they had suffered the greatest injury to the muscle. This effect of increased electric potential due to injury is known as demarcation potential or injury potential.

Other constructions could also be used. For instance the complete rear legs could be used with the sciatic nerves exposed so that the nerve of one frog could be connected to the feet of the next. Whole frogs too could be used. Although it was more time-consuming to prepare the thigh muscles, most experimenters preferred to do this since it gave better results.

== History ==
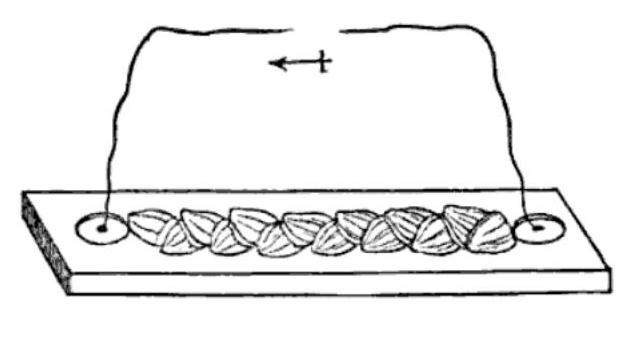
Bird's diagram of a frog battery, 1848

The first frog battery was constructed by Eusebio Valli in the 1790s with a chain of 10 frogs. Valli had difficulty understanding all of his own results; he followed Luigi Galvani in believing that animal electricity (or galvanic electricity) was a different phenomenon from metal-metal electricity (or voltaic electricity), even denying its existence. Alessandro Volta's theory was proved correct when he succeeded in constructing the voltaic pile without the use of any animal material. Because Valli found himself on the wrong side in this dispute, and refused to change his opinion despite the evidence, his work has become a bit of a backwater and his frog battery is little known and poorly documented.

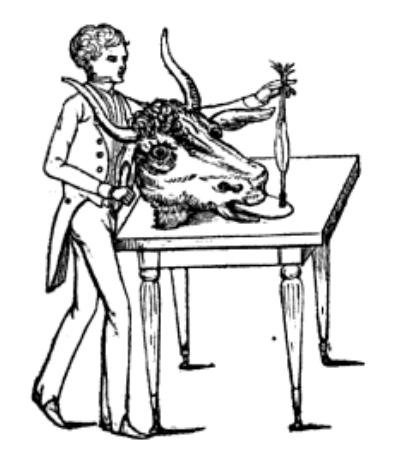
Aldini's 1803 ox-head battery

Leopoldo Nobili built a frog battery in 1818 out of complete frog legs which he called a frog pile. He used this to investigate animal electricity but his experiments were strongly criticised by Volta who argued that the true source of electricity was dissimilar metals in the external circuit. According to Volta, fluids in the frog merely provided the electrolyte.

The first well-known frog battery was constructed by Carlo Matteucci which was described in a paper presented to the Royal Society in 1845 by Michael Faraday on his behalf. It later also appeared in the popular medical student physics textbook Elements of Natural Philosophy by Golding Bird. Matteucci constructed his battery from a pile of 12 to 14 half-thighs of frogs. Despite the misguided theory behind the half-thigh battery, Matteucci's frog battery was nevertheless sufficiently powerful to decompose potassium iodide. Matteucci aimed with this apparatus to address Volta's criticism of Nobili by constructing a circuit, as far as possible, entirely out of biological material and hence prove the existence of animal electricity. Matteucci also studied the effects vacuum, various gases, and poisons had on the frog battery, concluding that in many cases its operation was not affected even when the substance would be toxic or lethal to the living animal.

Frogs were not the only creatures to be press-ganged into serving as battery components. In 1803, Giovanni Aldini demonstrated that electricity could be obtained from an ox head from a freshly killed animal. A frog galvanoscope connected between the ox's tongue and ear showed a reaction when the circuit was completed through the experimenter's own body. A greater reaction was obtained when Aldini joined two or three heads together into a battery. Later, in the 1840s, Matteucci also created eel batteries, pigeon batteries and rabbit batteries. Further, he created a battery out of living pigeons by connecting a wound made on the breast of one pigeon to the body of the next. Matteucci states that this design was based on a pre-existing battery of living frogs.

== Bibliography ==
- Bird, Golding Elements of Natural Philosophy, London: John Churchill 1848.
- Bird, Golding Lectures on Electricity and Galvanism, London: Longman, Brown, Green, & Longmans 1849.
- Clarke, Edwin; Jacyna, L. S. Nineteenth-Century Origins of Neuroscientific Concepts, University of California Press, 1992 ISBN 0-520-07879-9.
- Clarke, Edwin; O'Malley, Charles Donald The Human Brain and Spinal Cord: a historical study illustrated by writings from antiquity to the twentieth century, Norman Publishing, 1996 ISBN 0-930405-25-0.
- Hellman, Hal Great Feuds in Medicine, John Wiley and Sons, 2001 ISBN 0-471-34757-4
- Matteucci, Carlo "The muscular current" Philosophical Transactions, pp. 283–295, 1845.
- Matteucci, Carlo "Matteucci's lectures on living beings", American Journal of Science and Arts, series 2, vol.5, pp. 390–398, May 1848.
- Kipnis, Nahum "Changing a theory: the case of Volta's contact electricity", Nuova Voltiana, vol.5 (2003), pp. 143–162, Università degli studi di Pavia, 2003 ISBN 88-203-3273-6.
- Rutter, J. O. N. Human Electricity, J.W. Parker and Son, 1854.
- Valli, Eusobio; Moorcroft W. (trans.), Experiments on Animal Electricity, With Their Application to Physiology, London: Printed for J. Johnson, 1793 OCLC 14847798.
