= Astatic needles =

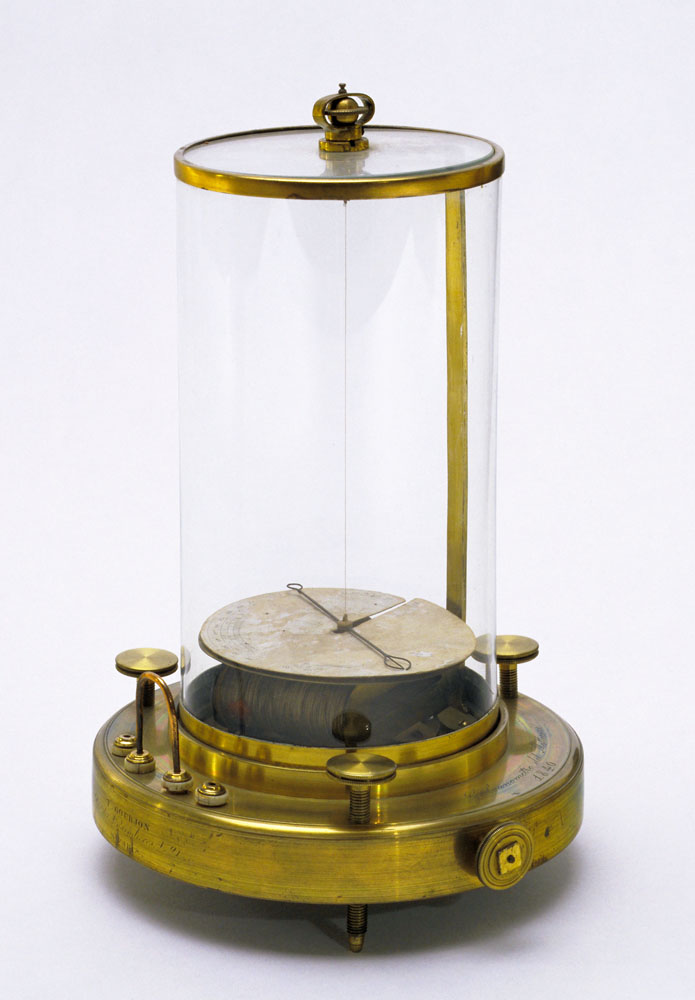
Astatic galvanometer, Nobili pattern at the Museo Galileo, Florence.

An astatic system comprises two equal and parallel magnetic needles, but with their polarities reversed. This arrangement protects the system from the influence of the terrestrial magnetic field, as the magnetisms of the two needles cancel each other out. Because of this phenomenon, astatic needles were often used in galvanometers.
