= Elmer J. Lund =

American physiologist (1884–1969)

Elmer Julius Lund (December 13, 1884 – 1969) was an American physiologist who is considered one of the early pioneers in the fields of Bioelectricity and Electrophysiology. He was also the founder of the Texas Marine Science Institute (UTMSI) at Port Aransas, and taught Zoology at the University of Texas.

== Bibliography ==
- The relations of Bursaria to food I. Selection in feeding and in extrusion (1914)
- Reversibility of morphogenetic processes in Bursaria (1917)
- The relative electrical dominance of growing points in the Douglas fir (1929)
- Internal distribution of the electric correlation potentials in the Douglas fir (1930)
- The unequal effect of O2 concentration on the velocity of oxidation in loci of different electric potential, and glutathione content (1931)
- Bioelectric fields and growth (1947)
- Momentum transfer at the high-latitude magnetopause and boundary layers (Date missing; reprinted in 2008)

== See also ==
- Current of injury
