= Robert O. Becker =

American orthopedic surgeon (1923–2008)

- Born: May 31, 1923; River Edge, New Jersey, US
- Died: May 14, 2008 (aged 84); Lowville, New York, US
- Education: Gettysburg College; New York University School of Medicine
- Known for: Father of Electromedicine; Electrochemically induced cellular regeneration
- Spouse: Lillian Janet Moller
- Children: 3
- Scientific career
- Fields: bioelectricity electromedicine
- Workplaces: Upstate Medical Center at State University of New York; Veterans Administration Hospital

Robert Otto Becker (May 31, 1923 − May 14, 2008) was an American orthopedic surgeon and researcher in electrophysiology and electromedicine. He worked as professor at Upstate Medical Center in State University of New York, Syracuse, and as Director of Orthopedic Surgery at the Veterans Administration Hospital, Syracuse, New York.

Becker was known for his work in bioelectricity and leading the early opposition to high-voltage power lines. He has been named as one of the most influential figures in the area of anti-EMF activism.

== Early life ==
Becker was born May 31, 1923, in River Edge, New Jersey to Otto Julius Becker and Elizabeth Blanck. He earned a bachelor's degree from Gettysburg College in 1946 and a medical degree from the New York University School of Medicine in 1948. Becker was an intern at New York's Bellevue Hospital, then completed a residency at Mary Hitchcock Memorial Hospital in Hanover, New Hampshire. Serving in the United States Army from 1942 to 1946, during World War II. Becker also served from 1951 to 1953 in the United States Army Medical Corps.

On September 14, 1946, Becker married Lillian Janet Moller in New Canaan, Connecticut. They resided in New York City and Valley Stream, New York before settling in the late 1950s in Syracuse where Becker joined the SUNY Upstate Medical Center.

== Research ==
Becker has been credited with furthering the scientific community's awareness of electric potentials in organisms. His work showed that living organisms and animals show a direct current of electric charge which is measurable from their body surface. In the 1960s Becker's research also showed that living bone can piezoelectrically generate electric potentials, which led to work on using electricity in the treatment of ununited fractures.Ultimately, however, the use of electrotherapy for increasing bone healing has not been shown to be effective.

Becker believed that extrasensory perception could occur from extremely low frequency (ELF) waves.

== The Body Electric ==
The Body Electric: Electromagnetism and the Foundation of Life is a 1985 book by Becker and Gary Selden in which Becker, an orthopedic surgeon at SUNY Upstate working for the Veterans Administration, described his research into "our bioelectric selves".

=== Overview ===
The first part of the book discusses regeneration, primarily in salamanders and frogs. Becker studied regeneration after lesions such as limb amputation, and hypothesized that electric fields played an important role in controlling the regeneration process. He mapped the electric potentials at various body parts during the regeneration, showing that the central part of the body normally was positive, and the limbs were negative. When a limb of a salamander or frog was amputated, the voltage at the cut (measured relative to the central part of the body) changed from about −10 mV (millivolts) to +20 mV or more the next day—a phenomenon called the current of injury. In a frog, the voltage would simply change to the normal negative level in four weeks or so, and no limb regeneration would take place. In a salamander, however, the voltage would during the first two weeks change from the +20 mV to −30 mV, and then normalize (to −10 mV) during the next two weeks—and the limb would be regenerated.

Becker then found that regeneration could be improved by applying electricity at the wound when there was a negative potential outside the amputation stub. He also found that bone has piezoelectric properties which would cause an application of force to generate a healing current, which stimulated growth at stress locations in accordance with Wolff's law.

In another part of the book Becker described potentials and magnetic fields in the nervous system, taking into account external influences like earth magnetism and the solar wind. He measured the electrical properties along the skin surface, and concluded that at least the major parts of the acupuncture charts had an objective basis in reality.

In the last chapters of the book, Becker recounts his experiences as a member of an expert committee evaluating the physiological hazards of various electromagnetic pollutions. He presents research data which indicate that the deleterious effects are stronger than officially assumed. His contention is that the experts choosing the pollution limits are strongly influenced by the polluting industry.

In 1998 Becker filed a patent for an iontopheretic system for stimulation of tissue healing and regeneration.

The title of the book is a reference to the fiction anthology I Sing the Body Electric! by Ray Bradbury, itself a reference to the poem of the same name by Walt Whitman.

=== Response ===
Library Journal called it "a highly informative book ... for educated lay readers". Kirkus Reviews said that "speculative and heated" conclusions "vitiate much of the interesting, well-documented material". The Sciences found that it was superficially well-told but with basic scientific errors and showing a lack of knowledge about recent biology. A short-form review in The New York Times said it "ends with a proposal for a new vitalism."

Developmental and synthetic biologist Michael Levin was inspired by Becker's work stating that the book looked like “everything I was thinking about,” and learned that medical interest in electricity was thousands of years old.

== Awards ==
In 1964, Becker received the William S. Middleton Award from the research and development agency of the United States Veterans Health Administration. The official research history of the SUNY Upstate Medical Center also states that Becker was awarded "the Nicolas Andry Award by the American Association of Bone and Joint Surgeons in 1979".

== Later life ==
In the years prior to his death, Becker lived in Lowville, New York. He died in Lowville's Lewis County General Hospital due to complications of pneumonia on May 14, 2008.

== Published works ==
Books

- Electromagnetism and Life. State University of New York Press, Albany 1982, ISBN 0-87395-560-9
- The Body Electric. Electromagnetism and the Foundation of Life (with Gary Selden). Morrow, New York 1985, ISBN 0-688-06971-1
- Cross Currents. The Promise of Electromedicine, the Perils of Electropollution. Torcher, Los Angeles 1990, ISBN 0-87477-536-1

As publisher

- Mechanisms of Growth Control, edited by Robert O. Becker. Thomas, Springfield 1981, ISBN 0-398-04469-4

Selected papers PubMed contains 91 listings for Becker RO. The listings below are some of those for which Becker is first author.

- Search for Evidence of Axial Current Flow in Peripheral Nerves of Salamander. Becker RO. Science. 1961 Jul 14;134(3472):101-2.
- Longitudinal direct-current gradients of spinal nerves. Becker RO, Bachman CH, Slaughter WH. Nature. 1962 Nov 17;196:675-6.
- Stimulation of partial limb regeneration in rats. Becker RO. Nature. 14 January 1972;235(5333):109-11.
- Electron paramagnetic resonance in non-irradiated bone. Becker RO. Nature. 1963 Sep 28;199:1304-5.
- Photoelectric effects in human bone. Becker RO, Brown FM. Nature. 1965 Jun 26;206(991):1325-8.
- Electron paramagnetic resonance spectra of bone and its major components. Becker RO, Marino AA. Nature. 1966 May 7;210(5036):583-8.
- Stimulation of partial limb regeneration in rats. Becker RO. Nature. 1972 Jan 14;235(5333):109-11.
- Electrical stimulation of partial limb regeneration in mammals. Becker RO, Spadaro JA. Bull N Y Acad Med. 1972 May;48(4):627-41.
- Regeneration of the ventricular myocardium in amphibians. Becker RO, Chapin S, Sherry R. Nature. 1974 Mar 8;248(444):145-7.

== Patents ==
Iontopheretic system for stimulation of tissue healing and regeneration US 5814094 A 1998

== See also ==
- Electromagnetic radiation and health § Electric power transmission
- L Field
- Electrotherapy
