= Thermo galvanometer =

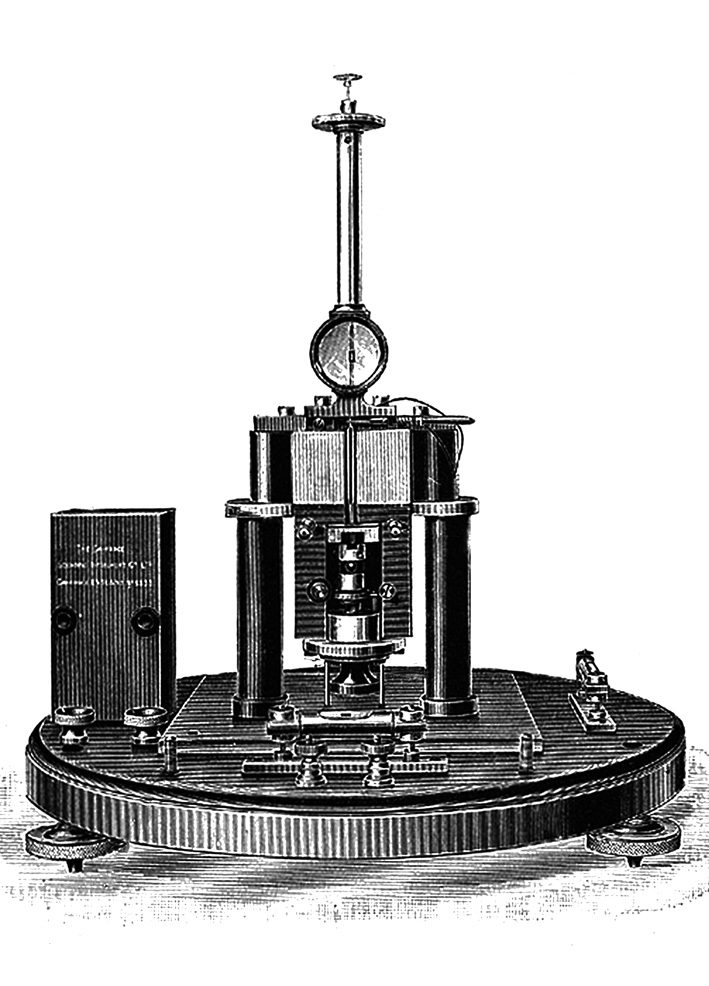
Thermo Galvanometer made by Cambridge Scientific Instrument Company Ltd.

The thermo-galvanometer is an instrument for measuring small electric currents. It was invented by William Duddell about 1900. The following is a description of the instrument taken from a trade catalog of Cambridge Scientific Instrument Company dated 1905:

For a long time the need of an instrument capable of accurately measuring small alternating currents has been keenly felt. The high resistance and self-induction of the coils of instruments of the electro-magnetic type frequently prevent their use. Electro-static instruments as at present constructed are not altogether suitable for measuring very small currents, unless a sufficient potential difference is available.

The thermo-galvanometer designed by Mr W. Duddell can be used for the measurement of extremely small currents to a high degree of accuracy. It has practically no self-induction or capacity and can therefore be used on a circuit of any frequency (even up to 120,000~ per sec.) and currents as small as twenty micro-amperes can be readily measured by it . It is equally correct on continuous and alternating currents. It can therefore be accurately standardized by continuous current and used without error on circuits of any frequency or wave-form.

The principle of the thermo-galvanometer is simple. The instrument consists of a resistance which is heated by the current to be measured, the heat from the resistance falling on the thermo-junction of a Boys radio-micrometer. The rise in temperature of the lower junction of the thermo-couple produces a current in the loop which is deflected by the magnetic field against the torsion of the quartz fibre.
