= Current of injury =

Body's electric current to damaged tissue

The current of injury – also known as the demarcation current, hermann's demarcation current or injury potential – is the electric current from the central part of the body to an injured nerve or muscle, or to another injured excitable tissue. The injured tissue has a negative voltage compared to the central part of the body.

== History ==
The concept originates from the research of Carlo Matteucci and Emil du Bois-Reymond in the mid-19th century. It has later occasionally been used in physiology textbooks, but is now mostly used in connection with heart damages (as listed in e.g. the index of Guyton's Textbook of Medical Physiology). Such manifestations in the heart may be seen in the electrocardiogram as Osborn waves.

It has been found by Elmer J. Lund that establishing an artificial electrical field causing a current mimicking the current of injury could facilitate regeneration. This potential for a regeneration therapy was further studied by Robert O. Becker, who described this work in his book The Body Electric. He found that the current of injury runs through the perineurium – through the myelin sheaths of the peripheral nerves.
