= Biobattery =

Energy storing device powered by organic compounds

A biobattery generates electricity using biological/organic compound materials and processes. Biofuel cells (BFCs) produce electrical energy through oxidation and reduction reactions at two electrodes using substances like glucose, bacteria, and enzymes. These enzymes present like they do in the human body and which break down glucose, then break down into electrons and protons which are released. Although the batteries have never been commercially sold, they are still being tested, and several research teams and engineers are working to further advance the development of these batteries. Related energy-harvesting devices that can aid in the creation of bio batteries development. For example, thermoelectric generators are not traditional chemical batteries but devices that convert fluctuations in temperature directly into electricity. Triboelectric nanogenerators and piezoelectric generators are devices that convert mechanical motion, pressure, or friction into electrical energy. These devices are starting to be researched by researchers for wearable devices and implanted sensors.

== History ==
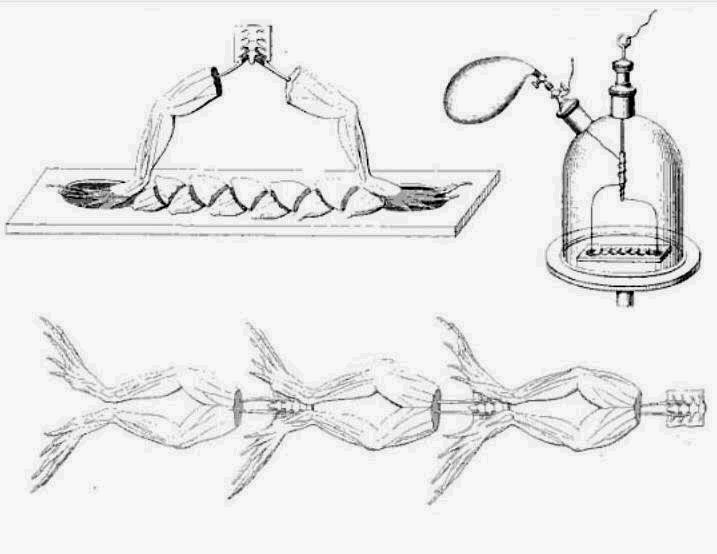
Matteucci's frog battery, 1845 (top left); Aldini's frog battery, 1818 (bottom); apparatus for controlled exposure of gases to frog battery (top right).

Biobatteries origins stem from the earliest experiments with bioelectricity, when scientists first began to wonder whether living organisms could produce electricity. In the late 1700s, Italian scientist Luigi Galvani observed that frog legs would twitch when they came into contact with different metals, which led him to believe in the idea of animal electricity. This curiously eventually inspired the development of the frog battery, where multiple frog muscles were connected in series to create a small but measurable electric current. In 1837, Carlo Matteucci improved this setup into a more reliable device by arranging frog tissues in a way that acted like a chain of electrochemical cells. Researchers also experimented with other animal tissues, including the ox-head battery, where freshly severed ox heads were used to demonstrate that biological tissue could carry and produce electrical signals. Although these experiments were later understood to rely on chemical reactions rather than a life supplying the energy, it allowed the scientists to gain a perspective on how electricity can come from living systems that follow the same principles of electrochemical that's found in commercial batteries. As the understanding of these systems improved, the experiments developed into simplest and more ethical demonstrations like the lemon battery. It is set up with two different metal electrodes, usually copper inserted into a lemon, and the fruit's acidic base acts as an electrolyte that allows electrons to flow through a circuit. The energy actually comes from the oxidation of zinc and reduction for hydrogen ions, not from the lemon itself which the fruit provides the medium as the place the reaction occurs. This does not only work for lemons, but a wide variety of different acidic fruits like oranges, grapefruits that have the same properties that can function as electrolytes in simple electrochemical cells.

== Workings ==
Like any battery, bio-batteries consist of an anode, cathode, separator, and electrolyte with each component layered on top of another. Anodes and cathodes are the positive and negative areas on a battery that allow electrons to flow in and out. The anode is located at the top of the battery and the cathode is located at the bottom of the battery. Anodes allow conventional current to flow in from outside the battery, whereas cathodes allow conventional current to flow out from the battery. As conventional current is opposite to electron flow, this means that cathodes allow electrons to flow into the battery and anodes allow electrons to flow out of the battery.

Between the anode and the cathode lies the electrolyte which contains a separator. The main function of the separator is to keep the cathode and anode separated, to avoid electrical short circuits. This system as a whole, allows for a flow of protons (H^{+}) and electrons (e^{−}) which ultimately generates electricity.

== Types of Biobatteries ==
Biobatteries utilize a wide range of chemistries, and use different methods to produce current. The efficiencies of these batteries are commonly measured as the voltage and current output, performance stability, and sustainability. Biobatteries serve many functions which will be discussed more in detail. Some biobatteries under development are intended to replace lithium ion batteries and therefore needing a high voltage, while low voltage designs are intended to identify gastrointestinal diseases. Depending on the application for its intended use, the performance and chemistry of biobatteries are specific. While there have been studies done on the efficiency of biobatteries, because of the many different types of biobatteries, there are only a few studies covering any one chemistry.

In general biobatteries tend to record a much lower voltage than lithium ion batteries. Some batteries cannot operate for longer than a few hours, but other batteries are capable of running off of sweat and mechanical energy allowing them to run for years, and potentially decades. Because biobatteries are made from biological agents and/or harvest their energy from biological agents, across the board, they tend to be more sustainable than their metal counterparts. They are currently used in low power technologies like pacemakers and insulin pumps, but are generally insufficient for technologies with significant power consumption like smartphones. While biobatteries have been studied for over a decade—and will likely take a significant amount of time to scale to the efficiency needed for applications like smartphones—biobatteries are proficient at operating in room temperature, which makes them useful tools for communities that need to power small medical devices but don't have access to constant refrigeration like developing countries.

=== Edible Batteries ===
In traditional batteries, energy is stored in the redox state. However, in edible batteries, researchers are looking to develop batteries that store energy in chemical bonds. At the Italian Institute of Technology, researchers are looking into ingestible electronics, a small pill that is swallowed to gather information on your digestive tract. By placing a microprocessor or LED, you can put a mini camera inside. They currently have very limited potential as they have very high costs, and may be environmentally costly as well. Caironi's team decided to create something without metal electrodes that people already have at home and has the possibility of recharging through energy harvesting. Researchers discovered that riboflavin (Vitamin B2) could serve as the battery anode and quercetin as the cathode. The electrodes are encapsulated in beeswax and the separator is made from nori seaweed used in sushi. The cell operates 0.65 Volts which is proven to not create problems in the body. It provides a current of 48 microAmps for 12 minutes or a lower level for more than an hour, enough to power low-power LEDs.

These batteries are being studied for use in biomedical applications, specifically for testing the pH of the stomach, and after further development, for diagnosing and treating gastrointestinal tract diseases. The advantage of these batteries is that they run on low voltages. Inside the body there is a risk of the battery breaking down and releasing its toxic materials. This is particularly risky above around 1.2 V. The safety of edible batteries, compared to other commercial batteries, also opens up possible applications in monitoring food quality and in edible soft robotics.

The efficiency of edible batteries should not be measured by the maximum voltage they can generate as they are made to generate voltages under around 1.2 V. While edible batteries might be capable of producing a higher voltage, a low voltage is necessary to prevent tissue damage, and worse side effects such as death, post-ingestion. The capacity for edible batteries ranges from 10 micro Ah to over 20 micro Ah. Some edible batteries have also been made to be rechargeable, indicating that they can be used multiple times.

=== Electric Eel ===
Researchers at Penn State use a fabrication method to layer multiple types of hydrogels in a pattern that replicates the ionic process we see in nature from electric eels when generating electrical bursts. Their work has been published in Advanced Science and their approach creates a power source that is flexible and environmentally stable.

To research this, Penn State looked into the biology of electric fish however the challenge is that the eel inspired devices produce limited power that would functionally support human design. By creating ultra thin hydrogel sheets, they were able to produce more power without the need of mechanical supports. With this, they were able to generate over 600 volts of electricity from small volumes. To ensure the batteries remained non-toxic, they were made only from hydrogel, allowing them to be more flexible despite being powerful.

The process is done via spin coating, layering material on a spinning surface of 20 mm thick. This process ensures high power while preserving mechanical strength and flexibility. Due to the gel like nature of hydrogels, they typically need external support structures to actually output high outputs. Viscosity of the gel plays the role in getting the layers just right because their first iterations would spin right off the table, so they had to increase the viscosity and mechanical strength to ensure the layer could be created.

By using equipment in the Materials Research Institute at Penn State, they collected electrochemical measurements from the power sources such as discharge rate, power density and conductive potential. With this improvement in the viscosity, the power densities were measure higher than before at 44 kW/m3. This power density allowed for implanted medical sensors and soft robotics controllers and wearable electronics to be powered.

To address concerns about hydrogels expected drying when exposed to air, the team incorporated the chemical glycerol, which allowed the hydrogel to remain functional from 80 C without freezing and is able to retain water longer than most hydrogels. As of today, this is the only hydrogel that acts as a power source entirely contained in a hydrogel solution that requires no external support.

Electric eel batteries are flexible and biocompatible, making them potentially usable for biomedical applications. These batteries are also environmentally stable, and with more development, would also ideally be able to recharge in their environments. This makes this potentially suitable for biological applications.

Electric eels are capable of generating over 600 V of electricity in one burst, and are capable of very high power densities. Multiple studies have found that battery cells made by electric eel electrolytes and hydrogels can produce over 100 mV of potential and maximum power densities ranging from 0.001 kW/ m^3 to 1500 kW/ m^3. These cells can be linked together to make cells with large voltage outputs, with some studies reporting voltages of over 100 V.

=== Bacteria Batteries ===
Microbial fuel cells (MFCs) function as rechargeable biobatteries powered by renewable resources. Electrogenic microbial biofilms oxidize organic matter and transfer the generated electrons to external circuits. The biocatalysts naturally self assemble, self repair and adapt to fluctuating environments. There are troubles with the anode interface due to challenges ensuring adequate nutrient diffusion, efficient waste removal, mechanical robustness, high electrical conductivity, compatibility with standard microfabrication processes and sustained microbial viability during harsh fabrication and storage conditions.

MFCs have potential applications in wastewater treatment because of their ability to convert organic matter into electricity and remove pollutants. Tested microbial fuel cells have been able to remove between 30% and 95% of incoming effluent from domestic and/ or synthetic wastewater depending on the structure of the battery as well as the anode, cathode, and membrane used. MFCs can potentially be used in remote areas to produce electricity using microbes specific to that area, or in environment-specific robotics.

To find the efficiency of microbial fuel cells, it is important to look at the anode, cathode, and membrane. Some combinations of anode, cathode, and membrane record power densities of less than 0.5 mW/ m^2, while others record over 100 mW/ m^2. Carbon and platinum are two of the most widely used cathodes for these types of cells. While platinum is a common material, researchers are looking for more cost efficient cathodes, as there are other materials that can potentially offer similar efficiencies with lower costs. The main goal of the cathode is to facilitate the oxygen reduction reaction, so choice in cathode significantly impacts the power density of the battery. Different microorganisms have vastly different power densities as well, with some microorganisms having a power density of just over 1 mW/ m^2, and others having power densities of over 4000 mW/ m^2.

=== Sugar Batteries ===
Biobatteries generate electricity through the chemical breakdown of organic compounds such as sugars and starches. This is a much more sustainable option to traditional batteries that rely on heavy metals and synthetic chemicals. They can even be compostable, so they are not hazardous. With ongoing improvements in energy density, enzyme efficiency, and microbial engineering, biobatteries may soon rival or surpass traditional batteries in specific use cases. Sony used glucose as the fuel source and produced a power output of 50 mW. Maltodextrin, a starch derivative, has a higher energy density than glucose and thus is potentially a superior fuel source to glucose. Because Maltodextrin can be derived from starch, it is therefore a renewable resource.

Sugar batteries are being looked at for use in implantable devices due to their biocompatibility and the body's abundant glucose that could be used to fuel the battery. In some examples, glucose in the bloodstream is oxidized to generate power. This type of battery was demonstrated in the stomach of a rat and was able to produce enough power to operate an LED or digital thermometer. This technology could go on to be used in pacemakers, biosensors, and drug delivery systems. Because fuel is being drawn from the body, it reduces the need for surgery or invasive methods for battery changes or replacement. Sugar batteries are also being looked at for portable and large-scale energy applications, meaning that they could theoretically be used as replacements for commercial batteries.

One study says that sugar biobatteries have an energy storage density capable of reaching 596 Ah kg^-1, a value over an order of magnitude higher than that of lithium-ion batteries. Additionally, while this battery produced a current far under that of a lithium-ion battery, it far surpassed that of common household rechargeable batteries. While these batteries do use plastics, they are regarded as being sustainable compared to regularly sold batteries.

=== Organic biobatteries ===
Organic biobatteries like the lemon battery use the acidity in foods as electrolytes for the battery. These batteries can use the entirety of the food, or certain parts of the food, like the peel, and utilize reduction-oxidation chemistry to produce a charge. Unlike MFCs, a form of bacteria biobatteries that can also use foods in fuel cells, organic biobatteries use acidic foods as one of the electrodes, while in MFCs they are used to form a biofilm on a metal electrode.

Research on biobatteries from organic waste is limited, but one study mentions using batteries from fruit peels for low energy applications like LEDs, wall clocks, and other small household devices.

Current organic biobatteries produce much lower efficiencies than lithium-ion batteries. The batteries can only last between 10–20 hours, and their maximum voltage and current output are around 1 V and .5 A, but they are made from household organic waste, making it significantly more sustainable than other batteries.

=== Piezoelectric and triboelectric ===
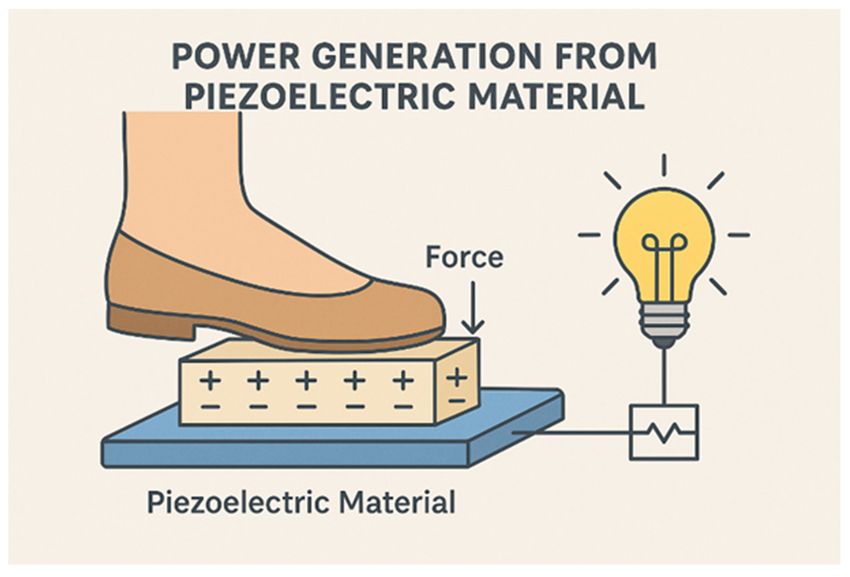
Demonstration of power generation via a person walking on a piezoelectric tile.

Piezoelectric and triboelectric generators create electrical energy from mechanical energy. Piezoelectric generators operate from the piezoelectric effect, wherein crystals in the material are sensitive to mechanical energy, and when subjected to pressure, an electric polarization is induced, causing an electric charge. Many bio-inspired piezoelectric generators have been studied in recent years, including eggshell, onion skin, fish bladder, and spider silk piezoelectric generators. Triboelectric generators, on the other hand, work from the triboelectric effect, where there is an electric charge transfer between two materials that have come in contact. A common example of this can be seen in the children's science experiment where a balloon is rubbed on their hair, and in turn, makes their hair stand, i.e. static electricity.

Piezoelectric and triboelectric generators have been studied for use in animal tracking. Piezoelectric generators offer the advantage of being chargeable through mechanical motion which circumvents the problem of batteries dying while on the animal, ending tracking unexpectedly. Both batteries are also capable of being environment resistant, meaning that they can withstand high humidity and other environmental factors. Both have also been looked at for various wearable, implantable, and portable devices, and even for energy generating tiles or sidewalks.

The voltage and current outputs from batteries of this type depend on the amount and force of the movements the battery is subjected to, as well as the frequency of periodic movements. Some methods like fractal design based switched-capacitor-converters, sliding, and freestanding mode in triboelectric generators can achieve energy transfer efficiencies in the 80s up to nearly 100%. Piezoelectric generators achieve a range of energy transfer efficiencies from 0.3% in fish bladder generators to 60% eggshell generators.

== Biomimicry ==
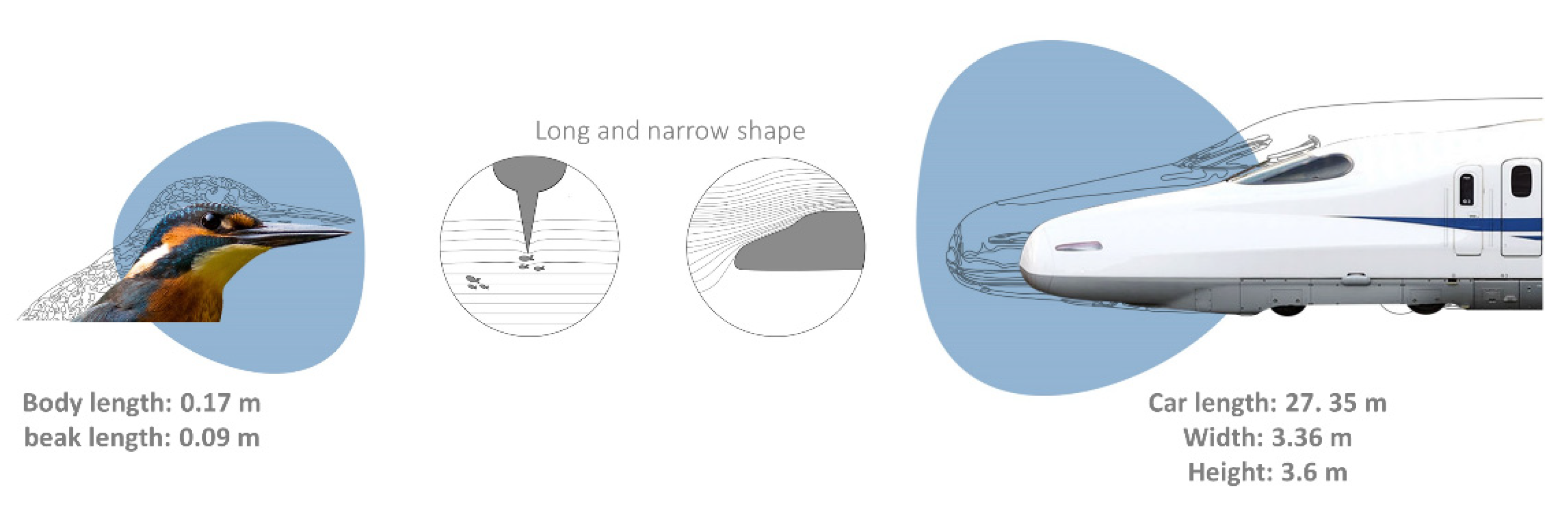
Biomimetics of Japanese Bullet Trains After the Kingfisher to Minimize Noise and Increase Efficiency

Biomimicry is the practice of modeling technology and solutions to problems from natural processes, ecosystems, and biological organisms. Examples of biomimicry are: Velcro, where the hook and latch system is inspired by burrs; Japanese bullet trains, where the train nose is inspired by the kingfisher (Alcedinidae) beak; and painless needles, where the shape is inspired by mosquito proboscis. Biobatteries draw inspiration from various biological systems to generate energy.

=== Electric Eel-Inspired Systems ===
Electric eels are marine fish that have their electrocytes stacked in parallel to produce voltage.

The electric eel (Electrophorus electricus) is one of the most studied biological inspirations for soft power sources. The electric eel has three electric organs that function to achieve a potential difference of 600 volts and 1 ampere currents. Thousands of cells called electrocytes are arranged in series across the body, and each produces a small ionic potential difference across a selectively-permeable membrane. All of these stacked cells add together to form a high-voltage discharge to help the eel hunt.

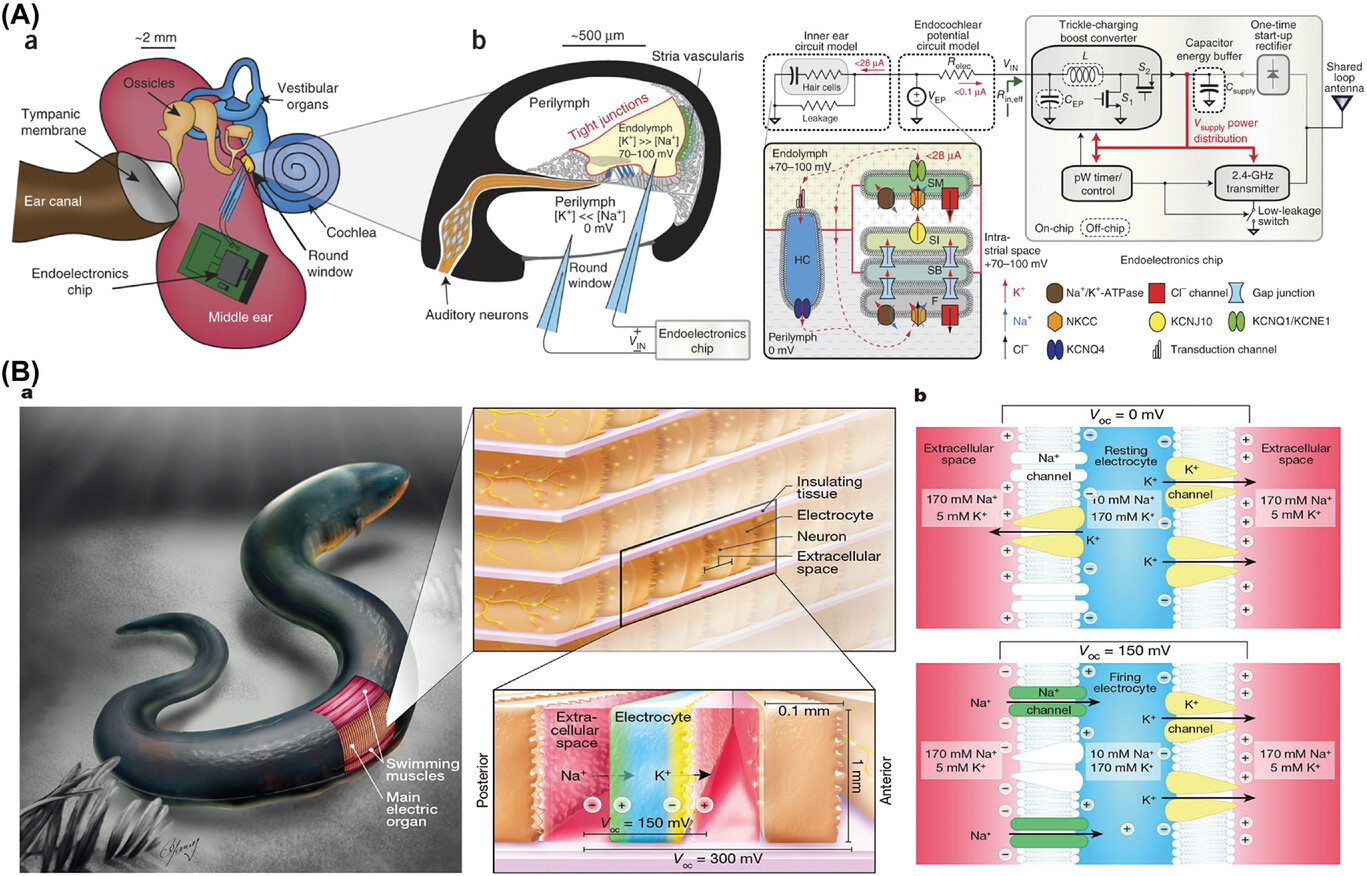
Part B shows the mechanics of a soft hydrogel power source modelling from stacked electric eel electrocytes.

Artificial electric models now exist that use ion gradients between miniature polyacrylamide hydrogel compartments. They are bounded by repeating cation and anion-selective hydrogel membranes and are arranged in a repeating stack scheme to generate 110 volts at open circuit. This system is flexible, transparent, and biocompatible, with potential uses in implantable medical devices. Other models applied spin coatings to make hydrogel-based power sources with reduced internal resistance. The reduced thickness of these hydrogels lowered internal resistance while maintaining mechanical stability, allowing power sources to produce power densities around 44 kW/m^{3}. This model worked in ambient air for several days and at temperatures as low as -80 degrees Celsius, and also was found to be the first hydrogel-based power source with no external support structure.

=== Plant-Inspired Systems ===
Photosynthesis has long provided a model for solar to chemical energy conversion through light-driven electron transport chains. Primarily, plant biology has influenced battery electrode design through surface chemistry and hierarchical pore structure. Plants have branching, vascular systems to transport ions and metabolites, which has inspired electrode materials design for how porosity affects electrolyte infiltrations and ion diffusion. Through compositional and structural arrangements, plants perform energy conversions and ion channel regulation, which has inspired battery electrode materials development. Chlorophyll-based photosynthesis has also inspired research into light-absorbing molecular structures being incorporated into electrode interfaces to supplement electrochemical processes.

=== Fatty Body Inspired Models ===
Organisms store and organize their energy in different ways. In animals, energy is stored in adipose tissue throughout the body. Using this scheme, rechargeable zinc-air batteries were integrated into structural surfaces of robots. These batteries were made with an aramid nanofiber membrane, a hydroxide conducting polymer gel electrolyte, a zinc anode, and an air cathode. The battery works when hydroxide ions are passed and stored through the zinc electrode and an electrolyte membrane made of an aramid nanofiber matrix in a water-based polymer gel. It is estimated this approach could provide up to 72 times the energy capability of a single lithium-ion cell battery.

== Environmental Impact ==
A dissolvable biobattery in solutions of 3.5 and 7 pH, after 0, 60, 90, and 160 minutes.

Biobatteries offer potentially environmentally friendly alternatives to conventional batteries by generating electricity from renewable biological processes. Biofuel Cells (BFCs) utilize compounds such as glucose or lactate, producing minimal chemical byproducts and reducing dependence on heavy metals. Additionally, triboelectric nanogenerators (TENGs) harvest biomechanical energy from biological motion, offering a low-waste method to power electronics without chemical emissions. Piezoelectric devices convert mechanical deformations from organs or movement into electrical energy, further reducing environmental contamination. These systems often employ flexible, biocompatible materials like polyvinylidene fluoride (PVDF), polyimide (PI), and polydimethylsiloxane (PDMS), which may reduce ecological impact. Additionally, certain types of biobatteries intended for short term or one time use can be designed using biodegradable materials layered onto a soluble paper, so that they are bioresorbable, or dissolvable under certain conditions.

== See also ==
- Bacterial nanowires
- Bioelectrochemical reactor
- Enzymatic biofuel cell
- Frog battery
- Lemon battery
- List of battery types
- Paper battery
