= Paper battery =

Type of battery

A paper battery is engineered to use a spacer formed largely of cellulose (the major constituent of paper). It incorporates nanoscopic scale structures to act as high surface-area electrodes to improve conductivity.

In addition to being unusually thin, paper batteries are flexible and environmentally-friendly, allowing integration into a wide range of products. Their functioning is similar to conventional chemical batteries with the important difference that they are non-corrosive and do not require extensive housing.

== Advantages ==
The composition of these batteries is what sets them apart from traditional batteries. Paper is abundant and self-sustaining, which makes paper cheap. Disposing of paper is also inexpensive since paper is combustible as well as biodegradable. Using paper gives the battery a great degree of flexibility. The battery can be bent or wrapped around objects instead of requiring a fixed casing. Also, being a thin, flat sheet, the paper battery can easily fit into tight places, reducing the size and weight of the device it powers. The use of paper increases the electron flow which is well suited for high performance applications. Paper allows for capillary action so fluids in batteries, such as electrolytes, can be moved without the use of an external pump. Using paper in batteries increases the surface area that can be used to integrate reagents. The paper used in paper batteries can be supplemented to improve its performance characteristics. Patterning techniques such as photolithography, wax printing, and laser micromachining are used to create hydrophobic and hydrophilic sections on the paper to create a pathway to direct the capillary action of the fluids used in batteries. Similar techniques can be used to create electrical pathways on paper to create paper electrical devices and can integrate paper energy storage.

Other advantages include:

1. Works as both a battery and a capacitor
2. Flexible
3. Incredibly thin
4. Long-lasting
5. Non-toxic
6. Steady power production
7. Biodegradable
8. Doesn't leak or overheat

== Disadvantages ==
Although the advantages of paper batteries are quite impressive, many of the components that make them great, such as carbon nanotubes and patterning, are complicated and expensive.

1. Prone to tearing.

2. Nanotubes made from carbon are expensive due to use of procedures like electrolysis and laser ablation.

3. Should not be inhaled, as they can damage lungs.

== Electrolytes ==
This cellulose based spacer is compatible with many possible electrolytes. Researchers used ionic liquid, essentially a liquid salt, as the battery’s electrolyte, as well as naturally occurring electrolytes such as human sweat, blood and urine. Use of an ionic liquid, containing no water, would mean that the batteries would not freeze or evaporate, potentially allowing operation in extreme temperatures. The operating conditions (e.g. temperature, humidity, static pressure) of such batteries would depend on the physical and chemical properties of the electrolyte, as well as the durability of the cellulose mesh; both potentially limiting factors.

== Potential applications ==
The paper-like quality of the battery combined with the structure of the nanotubes embedded within gives them light weight and low cost, offering potential for portable electronics, aircraft, automobiles and toys (such as model aircraft).

The batteries employ nanotubes, potentially slowing commercial adoption due to excessive cost. Commercial adoption also requires larger devices. E.g., a newspaper-sized device could be powerful enough to power a car.

Paper can be integrated into several different forms of batteries, such as electrochemical batteries, biofuel cells, lithium-ion batteries, supercapacitors, and nanogenerators.

=== Electrochemical batteries ===
Electrochemical batteries can be modified to integrate the use of paper. An electrochemical battery typically uses two metals, separated into two chambers and connected by a bridge or a membrane which permits the exchange of electrons between the two metals, thereby producing energy. Paper can be integrated into electrochemical batteries by depositing the electrode onto the paper and by using paper to contain the fluid used to activate the battery. Paper that has been patterned can also be used in electrochemical batteries. This is done to make the battery more compatible with paper electronics. These batteries tend to produce low voltage and operate for short periods of time, but they can be connected in series to increase their output and capacity. Paper batteries of this type can be activated with bodily fluids which makes them very useful in the healthcare field such as single-use medical devices or tests for specific diseases. A battery of this type has been developed with a longer life to power point of care devices for the healthcare industry. The device used a paper battery made using a magnesium foil anode and a silver cathode has been used to detect diseases in patients such as kidney cancer, liver cancer, and osteoblastic bone cancer. The paper was patterned using wax printing and is able to be easily disposed of. Furthermore, this battery was developed at a low cost and has other practical application.

=== Lithium-ion batteries ===
Paper can be used in lithium-ion batteries as regular, commercial paper, or paper enhanced with single-walled carbon nanotubes. Enhanced paper is used as the electrode and as the separator which results in a sturdy, flexible battery that have great performance capabilities such as good cycling, great efficiency, and good reversibility. Using paper as a separator is more effective than using plastic. The process of enhancing the paper, however, can be complicated and costly, depending on the materials used. A carbon nanotube and silver nanowire film can be used to coat regular paper to create a simpler and less expensive separator and battery support. The conductive paper can also be used to replace traditionally used metallic chemicals. The resulting battery performs well, while simplifying the manufacturing process and reducing the cost. Lithium-ion paper batteries are flexible, durable, rechargeable, and produce significantly more power than electrochemical batteries. In spite of these advantages, there are still some drawbacks. In order for paper to be integrated with the Li-ion battery, complex layering and insulating techniques are required for the battery to function as desired. One reason these complex techniques are used is to strengthen the paper used so that it does not tear as easily. This contributes to the overall strength and flexibility of the battery. These techniques require time, training, and costly materials. Additionally, the individual materials required are not environmentally friendly and require specific disposal procedures. Paper lithium-ion batteries would be best suited for applications requiring a substantial amount of energy over an extended period of time. Lithium-ion paper batteries can be composed of carbon nanotubes and a cellulose based membrane and produce good results, but at a high price tag. Other researchers have been successful using carbon paper manufactured from pyrolyzed filter paper. The paper is inserted in between the electrode and cathode. The use of a carbon paper as an interlayer in Li-S batteries improves the batteries efficiency and capacity. The carbon paper increases the contact area between the cathode and the electrode which allows for greater flow of electrons. The pores in the paper allow the electrons to travel easily while preventing the anode and the cathode from being in contact with one another. This translates into greater output, battery capacity and cycle stability; these are improvements to conventional Li-S batteries. The carbon paper is made from pyrolyzed filter paper which is inexpensive to make and performs like multi-walled carbon nanotube paper used as a battery.

=== Biofuel cells ===
Biofuel cells operate similarly to electrochemical batteries, except that they utilize components such as sugar, ethanol, pyruvate, and lactate, instead of metals to facilitate redox reactions to produce electrical energy. Enhanced paper is used to contain and separate the positive and negative components of the biofuel cell. This paper biofuel cell started up much more quickly than a conventional biofuel cell since the porous paper was able to absorb the positive biofuel and promote the attachment of bacteria to the positive biofuel. This battery capable of producing a significant amount of power after being activated by a wide range of liquids and then be disposed of. Some development must take place, since some components are toxic and expensive.

Naturally occurring electrolytes might allow biocompatible batteries for use on or within living bodies. Paper batteries were described by a researcher as “a way to power a small device such as a pacemaker without introducing any harsh chemicals – such as the kind that are typically found in batteries — into the body.”

Their ability to use electrolytes in the blood make them potentially useful for medical devices such as pacemakers, medical diagnostic equipment, and drug delivery transdermal patches. German healthcare company KSW Microtech is using the material to power blood supply temperature monitoring.

=== Supercapacitors ===
Paper battery technology can be used in supercapacitors. Supercapacitors operate and are manufactured similarly to electrochemical batteries, but are generally capable of greater performance and are able to be recharged. Paper, or enhanced paper can be used to develop thin, flexible supercapacitors that are lightweight less expensive. Paper that has been enhanced with carbon nanotubes is generally preferred over regular paper because it has increased strength and allows for easier transfer of electrons between the two metals. The electrolyte and the electrode are embedded into the paper which produces a flexible paper supercapacitor that can compete with some commercial supercapacitors produced today. A paper supercapacitor would be well suited for a high power application.

=== Nanogenerators ===
Nanogenerators are a more recent devices that convert mechanical energy to electrical energy. Paper is desirable as a component of nanogenerators for the same reasons discussed above. Such devices are able to capture movement, such as body movement, and convert that energy into electrical energy that could power LED lights, for example.

== See also ==
- List of battery types
