= Ross Day =

Australian experimental psychologist

Ross Henry Day Hon DSc, Hon FAPS, FASSA, FAA
- Born: 20 March 1927; Albany, Western Australia
- Died: 22 October 2018 (aged 91); Sale, Victoria
- Education: University of Western Australia
- Known for: first psychologist elected Fellow of the Australian Academy of Science
- Spouse: Grecian Snook
- Parents: Harold Lindsay Day (father); Dorothy Euphemia (née Currer) (mother)
- Scientific career
- Fields: Experimental psychology
- Workplaces: University of Western Australia, University of Bristol, University of Sydney, Monash University

Ross Henry Day (20 March 1927 – 22 October 2018) was an Australian experimental psychologist who investigated illusions and human and infrahuman sensory processes and perception and who was known for his formative role in the establishment of experimental psychology in Australia as Foundation Chair of psychology at Monash University in 1965. He was distinguished as the first psychologist elected Fellow of the Australian Academy of Science, was the foremost founder of the Australian Psychological Society in 1966, and initiated in Australia investigations of human factors in engineering and ergonomics.

== Early life and education ==
Ross Henry Day was born into a comfortably middle-class family, in Albany, Western Australia, on 20 March 1927, the son of Dorothy Euphemia (née Currer) and Harold Lindsay Day, who operated Day Brothers Bakery. After studying at Albany State Primary and Albany High School, and intending to study medicine, he undertook a Bachelor of Science at the University of Western Australia over 1944–1949 where his interests in psychology developed, and there he met Grecian Snook (1927–2017), an historian, in the halls of residence. In 1948 while he was still his third year at the University of Western Australia, Dr. Alexander (Tim) Marshall gave him a staff position as Graduate Assistant (Associate Lecturer) in Psychology. He graduated with first class honours and was offered a position in New South Wales, but chose to remain in Western Australia.

== United Kingdom ==
In 1949 Day was offered a teaching position at University of Bristol, England where he lectured 1950–1951 in Psychology, then in 1951 was appointed Research fellow in Psychology at Bristol, while undertaking a PhD in perceptual aspects of human skill (1952–4) funded by the UK’s Air Ministry to investigate perceptual factors in piloting high performance aircraft. In England, Ross and Grecian married in July 1951, spent their honeymoon in Somerset and, while still in England, had a child.

== University of Sydney ==
In 1955 Day took up a post as lecturer at the University of Sydney, where he set up a basic lab (later moved to a nearby factory) to investigate motion effects, and in 1962 he became Reader in Psychology and in 1964, the Chair of the Constitutions Committee of the Australian Psychological Society (FAPsS) and its Foundation Fellow. During Day’s tenure his sabbatical was spent at Brown University, USA assisting in research into involuntary eye movements (microsaccades) with Lorrin Andrews Riggs.

== Monash University ==
Day moved in 1965 to Monash University which appointed him as Professor and Foundation Chair of the Department of Psychology, a post he was to hold until 1992, and where he was joined by Ken Forster, Bill Webster, Dexter Irvine, and John Bradshaw. Concurrently, he was Councillor of the Australian Psychological Society 1965–1975, President of the Australian Psychological Society (1966–67), wrote his Human Perception, was Chair of the Human Factors Committee of the Australian Aeronautical Research Committee (1966–68), and Visiting Professor, University of Exeter, United Kingdom over 1971–72, and edited the Records of the Australian Academy of Science (1974–80) in which he was memorialised by Max Coltheart and Nicholas J. Wade whose PhD was supervised by Day.

In 1980 in Auckland Day gave evidence before a royal commission inquiring into the 28 November 1979 crash of a DC-10 into the Antarctic mountain Mount Erebus resulting in the deaths of all 257 aboard. He proposed that, in misperceiving visual observations, the crew's 'mental set' was fixed by their expectations that they were accurately following their flight plan which would take them clear of the mountain.

At Monash, Day promoted the discipline as a science, with its experimental laboratories located within the Faculty of Science and not to be seen as merely a “treatment procedure for people with emotional problems.” His leadership, distinguished by inquiry, rigour, commitment and productivity, influenced the scientific classification of psychology in Australian Universities. After legislation was passed by the Victorian Parliament in 1965, following a report by Mr Kevin Anderson QC, into Scientology, the Victorian Psychological Council of eight members including Day, was established to register all practising psychologists in Victoria. Day chaired the Human Research Factors Committee of the Australian Road Research Board (1969–1973). From 1981-83 Ross served as Associate Dean of the Faculty of Science and President of the Council of the Lincoln Institute. On the advent of the Australian Bicentenary, Day and Ronald Taft co-authored a 25-page history and survey, "Psychology in Australia" for the Annual Review of Psychology.

== Research ==
Day’s research focus was on perceptual processes for potential explanation of consciousness, investigating it through experimental psychology.

His first major book Human Perception on sensory transduction, methods of measuring basic sensory capacities, motion perception, brightness, colour, learning, and distorted inputs, was designed for use in undergraduate courses, and was described in an American Journal of Psychology review by Stanley Coren of the New School for Social Research as "traditional in content and format" clear in its writing and of "extremely broad scope," and in which...

the best of the chapters are those dealing with the areas in which Day himself has done research [...] sections on constancy (and its application to illusions), motion perception, and perceptual modification, which are clearly presented albeit theoretically rather one-sided...it endeavours not only to cover all of the topics but to incorporate data from vision, audition, and the chemical and mechanical senses as well. This results in rapid transitions...which makes the reading uncomfortably spasmodic, [so] the text would have been considerably improved if some breadth were sacrificed for more depth.

In a series of papers Day developed explanations for the Müller-Lyer, Poggendorff and Zöllner figures and the illusions with which they are associated, and was keynote speaker at the November 1985, Adelphi University International Conference on lllusory Contours partially funded by the United States Air Force Office of Scientific Research. His position on these illusions opposes his friend Richard Gregory's argument for acculturation of architectural space as influencing a false sense of perspective in such illusions. Ross countered that it is not the result of misapplied size constancy, but that all of these illusions rely on whole-part determination and space–time reciprocity, that the whole figure is the primary determinant of the illusion; "you don't change the perception of illusions very much with experience; it hardly changes them at all." In 2008 he explained the wider value of such studies:

...the way that illusions work offers us insight into how our perceptual systems work. Illusions are consistent across different observers, they don't disappear with repeated presentations and interestingly they also occur in sensory modalities other than vision, you can actually experience a Müller-Lyer in tactile mode. I think these facets of illusions tell us a lot about our normal processing abilities.

In allied work he examined the role of lightness, hue and saturation in feature-based visual attention, used experimentation to explain motion after-effects, visual aftereffects from patterns, tested the role of the right brain hemisphere in facial recognition, and characterised accommodation in clinical hemianopic defects in vision, particularly accommodative micropsia. Accounts of his investigations of infant spatial orientation and other perceptual development form a large part of his output, and his experiments on size constancy with Beryl McKenzie discovered that at around six months of age young babies appropriately 'postured' their hand when reaching through either horizontal or vertical elongated apertures to grasp a desirable object, thus perceiving, anticipating and accommodating to the intervening apertures. Published in their edited Perceptual Development in Early Infancy: Problems and Issues were Day's findings about visual constancy and McKenzie's research into changes in spatial orientation, and essays by Australians Denis Burnham, Michael Cook, Boris Crassini, Lynda Earnshaw, Jeff Field, David Finlay, Algis Ivinskis, Ray Over, Maria Quinn, Sharne Rolfe Zikman which covered a collection of diverse perspectives, theory and methodologies relating to object perception, visual size constancy, and shape constancy within the first year of an infant's development. Day and McKenzie co-wrote the concluding reflection, from which reviewer Massaro highlights the unresolved controversy between direct and indirect perception points of view:

The hopeful note is that we now have more powerful techniques to address the issue. A second observation involves the importance of determining process rather than simply outcome. Finding an increase in the accuracy of spatial perception or speech perception with age is not as important as uncovering the processes responsible for this increase. Related to the orientation towards process is the need for a fine-grain analysis of behavior. As an example, the duration of looking in a habituation study can be supplemented with measures of the nature of the behaviour during looking.

Day's 1990s experiments with the Bourdon illusion, in which a straight line appears to be bent in the direction of an adjacent, actually bent, contour, determined that the illusion works as effectively in an active haptic version as the visual, for which accounted in the compromise in perception between the orientation of the test surface and that of the object of which it is an integral part. Building on such research, and by focusing on evidence from illusions, Day proposed a theory (published 2014) that explained both accurate and illusory perception in the same way, arguing that the two are essentially the same process.

In 2003 Day's further investigations, with Best and Cassini, into retinal flow, discovered that humans judge self-movement (heading) from retinal image depth, motion direction, and velocity changes, but two experiments with even minimal stimuli suggested that the magnitude of retinal image velocity change—not just acceleration or deceleration—contributed to heading judgments under minimalist conditions.

Well into the twenty-first century Day contributed his findings on infant development to the international literature on intellectual disability.

A member of the Australian Research Grants Committee (now the Australian Research Council) Day advocated for research funding for the discipline.

== Later life ==
Day retired from Monash in 1992 returning 1993–2008 as chair the Monash University Animal Welfare Committee (MUAWC), a position he held until 2008. That year he researched and published the genealogy Albany days: a family history.

Day also worked from 1992 as an Adjunct Professor in Psychology at La Trobe University (Bundoora) and Deakin University (Geelong).

Ross Day died on 22 October 2018 at his home in Sale, aged ninety-one.

== Awards ==
- In 1988 La Trobe University made Ross a Doctor of the University, honoris causa.
- 1990: Ross was the first psychologist to be elected as a Fellow of the Australian Academy of Science aged 63, noted as "distinguished among Australian scientists for his efforts to have experimental psychology recognised as one of the biological sciences."
- 1992: Honorary Fellow of the Australian Psychological Society (APS) having been its President from 1966-1967.
- Ross was awarded the title Emeritus Professor by Monash University in 1993.

== Publications ==
=== Selected books and book chapters ===
- Day, Ross H.; Baxter, J.R. (1959). A comparison of two types of visual approach aid. Melbourne, Vic.: Aeronautical Research Laboratories. OCLC 1109591511.
- Baxter, J.R.; Day, Ross H.; Lane, J.C. (1960). Sensitivity of the precision visual glidepath (P.V.G.) at long range. Melbourne, Vic.: Department of Supply, Australian Defence Scientific Service, Aeronautical Research Laboratories. OCLC 1000312823.
- Baxter, J.R.; Day, Ross H. (1961). An investigation of crew duties in the 'electra' cockpit. Melbourne, Vic.: Aeronautical Research Laboratories. OCLC 1109494408.
- Day, Ross Henry (1962). The effects of repeated trials and prolonged fixation on error in the Müller-Lyer figure. Psychological monographs, 76, 533. Washington, D.C.: American Psychological Association. OCLC 469881070.
- Baxter, J. R.; Cumming, R W; Day, Ross H. (1963). Study of three pilot operation of a jet transport aircraft. Australian defence scientific service human engineering report, 03. OCLC 61798413.
- Day, Ross H. (1969). Human perception (1st ed.). Sydney: Wiley & Sons Australasia. ISBN 9780471199953.
- Day, R. H.; Day, R. H., eds. (1977). Studies in perception. Nedlands: Univ. of Western Australia. ISBN 978-0-85564-121-4.
- Day, Ross H. (1987). "Cues for Edge and the Origin of Illusory Contours: An Alternative Approach". In Petry, Susan; Meyer, Glenn E. (eds.). The Perception of Illusory Contours. New York, NY: Springer New York. ISBN 978-1-4612-4760-9.
- McKenzie, Beryl E.; Day, R. H., eds. (1987). Perceptual development in early infancy: problems and issues. Hillsdale, N.J: L. Erlbaum Associates. ISBN 978-0-89859-943-5.
- Day, SoledadR H (25 February 2014). "The Foundations of Veridical and Illusory Perception". In Ballesteros, Soledad; Ballesteros, Soledad (eds.). Cognitive Approaches to Human Perception (1st ed.). New York: Psychology Press. doi:10.4324/9781315807126. ISBN 978-1-317-78260-5.

=== Articles ===
Day contributed articles to such journals as Psychological Review, Perception and Psychophysics, Perception, Cortex, Vision Research, Journal of Experimental Psychology, Human Factors, The American Journal of Psychology, Brain and Cognition, Science, and the International Review of Research in Mental Retardation.
