= Wenceslaus Johann Gustav Karsten =

German mathematician (1732–1787)

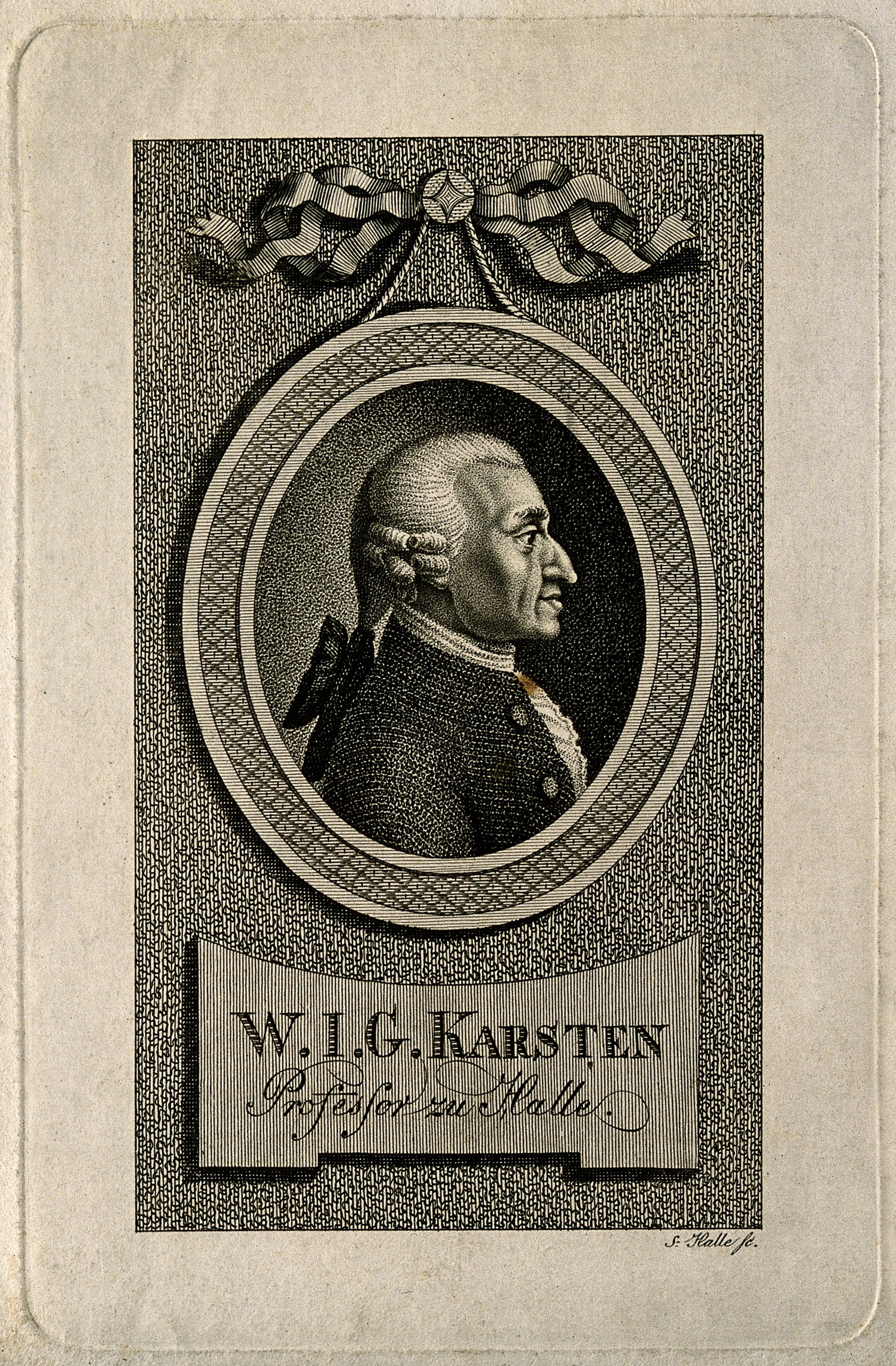
- W.J.G. Karsten Credit: Wellcome Library
- Born: 15 December 1732; Neubrandenburg
- Died: 17 April 1787 (aged 54); Halle an der Saale
- Education: University of Rostock
- Known for: Complex logarithms
- Scientific career
- Fields: Mathematics
- Workplaces: University of Halle

Wenceslaus Johann Gustav Karsten (15 December 1732 – 17 April 1787) was a German mathematician. In 1768, Karsten published a graphic representation of infinitely many logarithms of real and complex numbers. He was a professor of Mathematics at the Universities of Rostock, Bützow and Halle.

== Education and early life ==
He was born Neubrandenburg but grew up with his grandfather in Güstrow where he attended high school. From 1750, he studied theology at the Universities in Rostock and Jena but also heard lectures on mathematics and philosophy. In 1754, he returned to Güstrow with the aim to become a priest. As he heard the University of Rostock was in need of a mathematician, he returned to the University of Rostock and also graduated in mathematics in February 1755. The same year, he lectured on mathematics at the same University. Not satisfied with his salary, he unsuccessfully applied as a teacher at high schools in Hamburg and Stettin. After in 1758 the professor of logic Johann Ludwig Engel died, he was able to succeed him.

== Professional career ==
In 1760, after a dispute between Frederick II, Duke of Mecklenburg-Schwerin and the University of the appointment of a new professor of theology, lead the former to establish a new University in Bützow. Karsten, who was paid by the Duke, had to teach at the new University. Again, his financial situation was not as wished, and in 1763 Karsten wrote to Johann Euler, a son of Leonhard Euler, that he would like to become a lecturer in Saint Petersburg. In 1764, he was offered an employment at the University of Helmstedt. Still teaching at Bützow, he also received a call to Saint Petersburg in 1765. But after the Duke raised his salary significantly, Karsten turned both job offers down and stayed at Bützow. In 1778, after the death of Johann Andreas Segner, a Professor at the University of Halle, Karsten became Segners successor. In Halle, he turned his interest to the natural sciences and chemistry. In 1783, his assistant became Friedrich Albrecht Carl Gren, who would later become a prominent figure in the field of chemistry. Karsten is credited with raising chemistry to an equally accepted department beside the physics at the universities. Karsten died in 1787.
