= Neubrandenburg (painting) =

Painting by Caspar David Friedrich

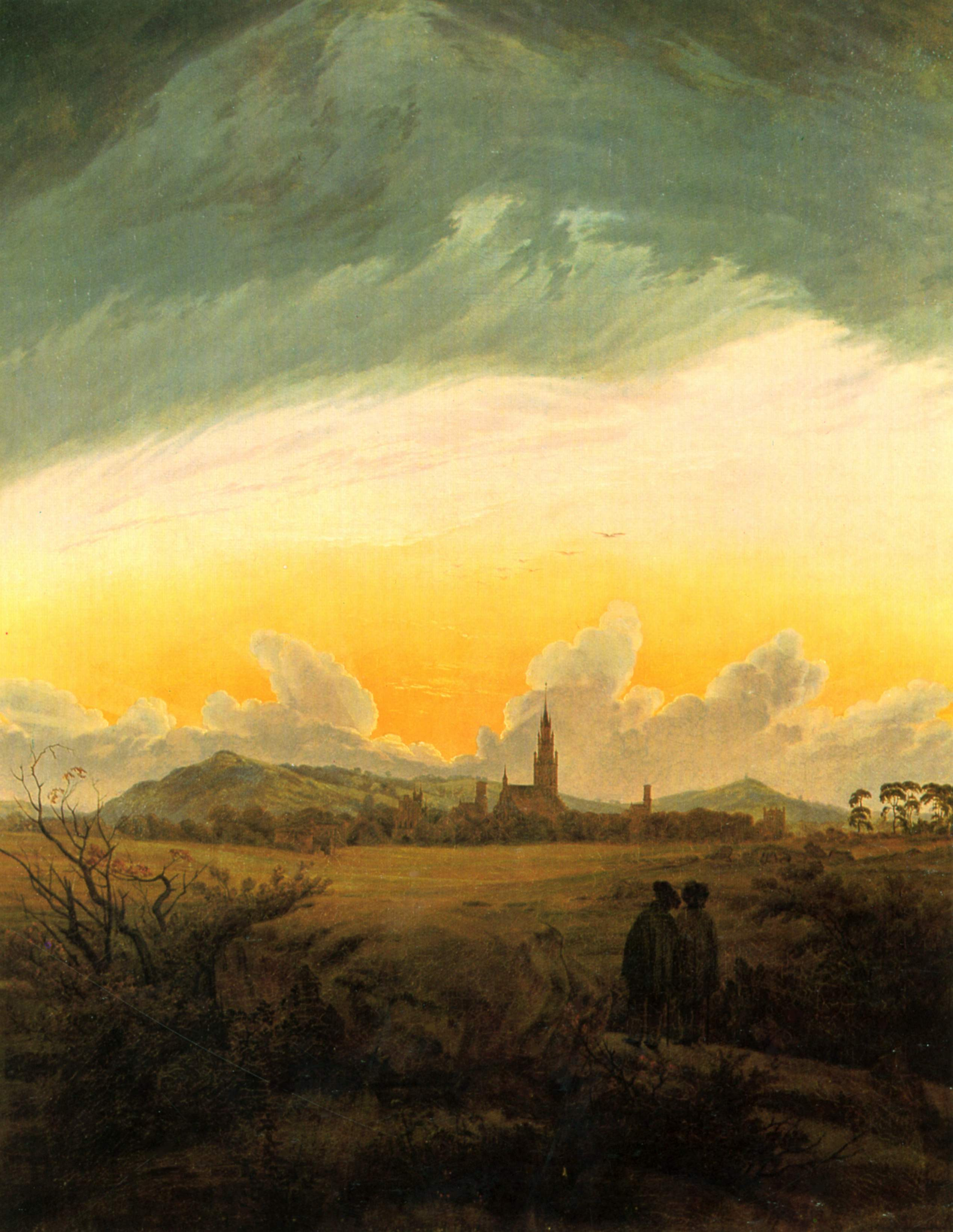
- Artist: Caspar David Friedrich
- Year: 1816
- Medium: oil on canvas
- Dimensions: 91 cm × 72 cm (36 in × 28 in)
- Location: Pomeranian State Museum, Greifswald

Neubrandenburg or Neubrandenburg in the Morning Mist (German: Neubrandenburg im Morgennebel) is an oil on canvas painting by the German artist Caspar David Friedrich, executed c. 1816, now in the Pomeranian State Museum in Greifswald. The artist's parents were both born in Neubrandenburg and he often painted it – another example is Neubrandenburg Burning.

Until 1900, it was owned by Langguth, a Greifswald merchant and relation of the artist. Around 1928, it was acquired by the Städtisches Museum Stettin and was placed in the Stettiner Gemäldesammlung on the Veste Coburg from 1945 until 1970, before moving to the Stiftung Pommern in Kiel. It has been in its present location since 1999.

== See also ==
- List of works by Caspar David Friedrich
