= Friedrich Albrecht Carl Gren =

German chemist (1760–1798)

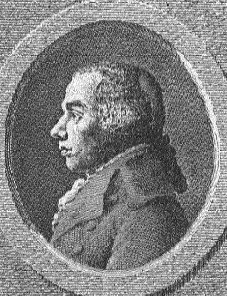
Portrait of Friedrich Albrecht Carl Gren

Friedrich Albrecht Carl Gren (1 May 1760 – 26 November 1798) was a German chemist and a native of Bernburg.

He began his career working in a pharmacy in Bernburg, and later worked as a pharmacist in Offenbach am Main and Erfurt. In 1782, he began his studies at the University of Helmstedt, and in 1788 became professor of chemistry and physics at the University of Halle.

In 1783, he became the assistant to Wenceslaus Johann Gustav Karsten at the University of Halle. In 1790, Friedrich Gren was founder of the Journal der Physik (in 1795-97 called Neues Journal der Physik), which in 1799 was renamed Annalen der Physik by Ludwig Wilhelm Gilbert (1769-1824). Today, it is the oldest and one of the best-known journals on physics. He was also the author of a popular textbook on chemistry titled Systematisches Handbuch der gesamten Chemie.

Gren was a major proponent in regards to the existence of phlogiston. After Antoine-Laurent Lavoisier (1743-1794) demonstrated that combustion required oxygen, he compromised his beliefs, and postulated that oxygen and phlogiston worked alongside each other.

== Selected writings ==
- Betrachtungen über die Gärung, (Reflections on fermentation), 1784
- Systematisches Handbuch der gesamten Chemie, (Systematic textbook on all chemistry), 1787–1794, last edition- 1819 (1787-1790) Digital edition / (1806-1807) Digital edition by the University and State Library Düsseldorf
- Grundriss der Naturlehre, 1787, sixth edition- 1820 Digital 5th edition from 1808 by the University and State Library Düsseldorf
