= Poggendorff illusion =

Geometrical-optical illusion

A straight black and red line is obscured by a grey rectangle. The blue line, rather than the red line, appears to be a continuation of the black one, which is clearly shown not to be the case on the second picture. Instead there is an apparent position shift of the lower portion of the line.

The Poggendorff illusion is a geometrical-optical illusion that involves the misperception of the position of one segment of a transverse line that has been interrupted by the contour of an intervening structure. It is named after Johann Christian Poggendorff, the editor of the journal, who discovered it in the figures Johann Karl Friedrich Zöllner submitted when first reporting on what is now known as the Zöllner illusion, in 1860. Although Zöllner was focused on a different illusion, the misalignment of the diagonal lines revealed a distinct visual phenomenon. The Poggendorff illusion has become a widely studied example of spatial misperception in vision science and psychology. It has been used to investigate theories of perceptual systems, neurological function, and cognitive development.

The magnitude of the illusion depends on the properties of the obscuring pattern and the nature of its borders. Many detailed studies of the illusion, including "amputating" various components point to its principal cause: acute angles in the figure are seen by viewers as expanded though the illusion diminishes or disappears when the transverse line is horizontal or vertical. Other factors, such as the angle of the line, the width of the occluder, and the overall orientation of the figure, also influence its strength.

== Theoretical explanations ==
Multiple explanations have been proposed for the Poggendorff illusion, most attributing it to a combination of perceptual and cognitive factors rather than a single cause.

=== Angle misperception ===
One of the most established accounts attributes the illusion to distortions in how the brain processes angles and spatial orientation. Ross H. Day and Ross G. Dickinson (1976) argued that the illusion results from a combination of perceptual biases, including the horizontal–vertical effect, the longitudinal–transverse effect, and misjudgment of acute and obtuse angles. Acute angles tend to be perceived as wider than they are, shifting the apparent continuation of the oblique line. The illusion persists even when the orientation of the lines remains constant, suggesting the distortion occurs in the space between them rather than in the lines themselves.A weaker misalignment effect occurs even without the occluding parallels, reinforcing the role of angle-based distortion.

Weintraub et al. (1980) subsequently found that misalignment increases with obtuse angle size and changes with the transversal's orientation, further supporting the angle misperception and orientation bias explanation.

=== Depth processing and scene inference ===
Another influential view is depth processing theory, where the brain interprets two-dimensional figures as three-dimensional scenes. Gillam (1971) and later Spehar and Gillam (2002) proposed that the central rectangle is seen as a foreground surface, while the oblique lines appear as receding into depth, causing perceived misalignment. When visual cues like luminance are used to make the obliques appear in front of the rectangle, the illusion is reduced, supporting the depth misperception explanation. Gregory (1968) described such illusions as errors arising from the brain's use of internal assumptions to solve perceptual problems.

A related account, the natural scene geometry theory, proposes that the illusion reflects learned expectations from everyday visual experience. Howe et al. (2005) analysed thousands of real-world 3D scenes and found that interrupted lines in the everyday environment often appear misaligned when occluded. The brain generalises from this experience, "expecting" a misalignment even when none exists. These accounts suggest that the visual system applies depth-based heuristics, either from internal encoding or real-world visual experience.

=== Neural mechanisms ===
Houck and Mefferd (1973) suggested that the illusion may arise from how orientation-sensitive neurons in the visual cortex respond to edges and angles. When oblique lines and an occluder are viewed together, interactions between these neurons can disrupt the brain's ability to link the segments correctly, causing perceived misalignment. Recent neuroimaging research by Shen et al. (2016) shows that real and illusory contours engage different brain regions. Real lines activate ventral visual areas involved in detailed processing, while inferred lines engage dorsal regions linked to spatial construction. The Poggendorff illusion may result from a discrepancy between these systems, where the ventral stream encodes visible segments accurately but the dorsal stream reconstructs the hidden continuation incorrectly, causing misalignment.

=== Secondary accounts ===
Lucia Zanuttini (1976) proposed that the illusion results from amodal completion, which is the brain's tendency to fill in missing parts of an object when obscured. She suggested that the occluded surface appears perceptually shrunken, making the reconstructed diagonal appear shorter and misaligned. Enlarging the occluder by about 30% restored perceived alignment, supporting the role of surface compression.

Pressey and Sweeney (1972) suggested an assimilation theory, where the brain averages competing line projections near the intersection, giving more weight to shorter segments. This shifts the diagonal's apparent direction and explains both classical and reversed versions of the illusion.

Although grounded in established perceptual theories, these models have received less empirical attention in Poggendorff research.

== Development and individual differences ==
Studies show that the strength of the illusion varies by age and cognitive profile. Children may be more susceptible than adults, with Chouinard et al. (2021) finding a steady decline in illusion magnitude from ages 6 to 14, stabilising at around 21.6 years. This suggests that as visual and cognitive systems mature, individuals become better at correcting for misleading visual cues.

Leibowitz and Gwozdecki (1967) observed that individuals with intellectual disabilities remain highly susceptible regardless of age, supporting the idea that the illusion is modulated by higher-level cognitive functions like reasoning and spatial inference. Also, illusion strength has been linked to language and reasoning skills, but not to basic visual alignment skills, suggesting cognitive development is more influential than visual perception alone. Visual expertise and attention may also contribute, though further research is needed.

== Clinical applications ==
The Poggendorff illusion has also been used in clinical studies. Higashiyama et al. (2023) found that patients with cerebellar stroke were less affected by the illusion than healthy individuals, especially when the stroke involved the right posteromedial cerebellum. This suggests that the cerebellum may play a role in how the brain processes spatial relationships, and that visual illusions like the Poggendorff could potentially serve as diagnostic tools in neurological assessment.

== Related illusions ==
The Poggendorff illusion belongs to a broader class of geometrical-optical illusions highlighting how spatial context influences perception.Related illusions include:

- Zöllner illusion
- Müller-Lyer illusion
- Ponzo illusion
