= Nicholas J. Wade =

British psychologist and academic (born 1942)

- Born: Nicholas J. Wade; 27 March 1942 (age 84)
- Scientific career
- Fields: Psychology, visual perception and neuroscience
- Workplaces: University of Dundee in Scotland

Nicholas J. Wade (27 March 1942) is a British psychologist and academic. He is an emeritus professor in the psychology department of the University of Dundee in Scotland, and the author of books and technical articles. He was supervised for his PhD by Ross Day, and is known for his work on visual perception, illusions, history of perception, and psychology of art and aesthetics.

== Books ==
- Wade, N. J. (2017). Visual Allusions: Pictures of Perception. London: Routledge. Psychology Library Editions: Perception (Book 32). ISBN 1138205087 (Hbk) 9781138205086 (eBook)
- Wade, N. J. (2016). Art and Illusionists. Heidelberg: Springer. ISBN 9783319252278 (Hbk) 9783319252292 (eBook)
- Piccolino, M., and Wade, N. J. (2014). Galileo's Visions: piercing the spheres of the heavens by eye and mind. Oxford: Oxford University Press. ISBN 9780199554355(Hbk) 9780199554358 (Pbk).
- Wade, N. J., and Swanston, M. T. (2013). Visual Perception: An Introduction. 3rd. Ed. Hove, UK: Psychology Press. ISBN 9781848720428 (Hbk) 9781848720425 (Pbk)
- Meulders, M., Piccolino, M., and Wade, N. J. (Eds.) (2010). Giuseppe Moruzzi, Ritratti di uno scienziato, Portraits of a scientist. Pisa: Edizioni ETS. ISBN 978-88-46724-97-7
- Wade, N. J. (2007) Circles: Science, Sense and Symbol. Dundee: Dundee University Press. ISBN 978-1-84586-019-6. Details
- Piccolino, M., and Wade, N. J. (2007) Insegne Ambiguë. Percorsi Obliqui tra Storia, Scienza e Arte, da Galileo a Magritte. Pisa: Edizioni ETS. ISBN 978-88-467-1736-8. Details
- Wade, N. J., and Tatler, B. W. (2005) The Moving Tablet of the Eye: The Origins of Modern Eye Movement Research. Oxford: Oxford University Press. ISBN 0-19-856616-6 (Hbk.), 0198566174 (Pbk.) Details
- Wade, N. J. (2005) Perception and Illusion. Historical Perspectives. New York: Springer. Details
- Wade, N. J. (2003) (Ed.) Müller’s Elements of Physiology. 4 vols. Bristol: Thoemmes. Details
- Wade, N. J. (2003) Destined for Distinguished Oblivion: The Scientific Vision of William Charles Wells (1757-1817). New York: Kluwer/Plenum.
- Wade, N. J. (2002) (Ed.) Thomas Young's Lectures on Natural Philosophy and the Mechanical Arts (1807). Bristol: Thoemmes.
- Wade, N.J., and Swanston, M. (2001) Visual Perception: An Introduction. 2nd edition. London: Psychology Press.
- Wade, N. J., and Brozek, J. (2001) Purkinje's Vision. The Dawning of Neuroscience. Mahwah, NJ: Lawrence Erlbaum Associates.
- Wade, N. J. (2000) (Ed.) The Emergence of Neuroscience in the Nineteenth Century. 8 vols. London: Routledge/Thoemmes Press.
- Wade, N. J. (2000) (Ed.) Helmholtz's Treatise on Physiological Optics. 3 vols. Bristol: Thoemmes Press.
- Wade, N. J. (1998) A Natural History of Vision. Cambridge, MA: MIT Press.
- Wade, N. (1995) Psychologists in Word and Image. Cambridge, MA: MIT Press. (Korean language edition translated by Sang-Hun Lee. Saegil Publishing Co. 1996.)
- Wade, N.J., and Swanston, M. (1991) Visual Perception: An Introduction. London: Routledge. (Israeli edition translated by Bat'sheva Mance. Ach, Tel Aviv. 1994.)
- Wade, N. (1990) Visual Allusions: Pictures of Perception. London: Lawrence Erlbaum. (Japanese language edition translated by Michiaki Kondo. Nakanishiya Shuppan, Tokyo. 1991.)
- Wade, N.J. (1983) (Ed.) Brewster and Wheatstone on Vision. London: Academic Press.
- Wade, N. (1982) The Art and Science of Visual Illusions. London: Routledge & Kegan Paul. (Japanese language edition translated by Michiaki Kondo. Seishinshobo, Tokyo. 1988.)
