= Ruins of Eldena Abbey in the Riesengebirge =

Painting by Caspar David Friedrich

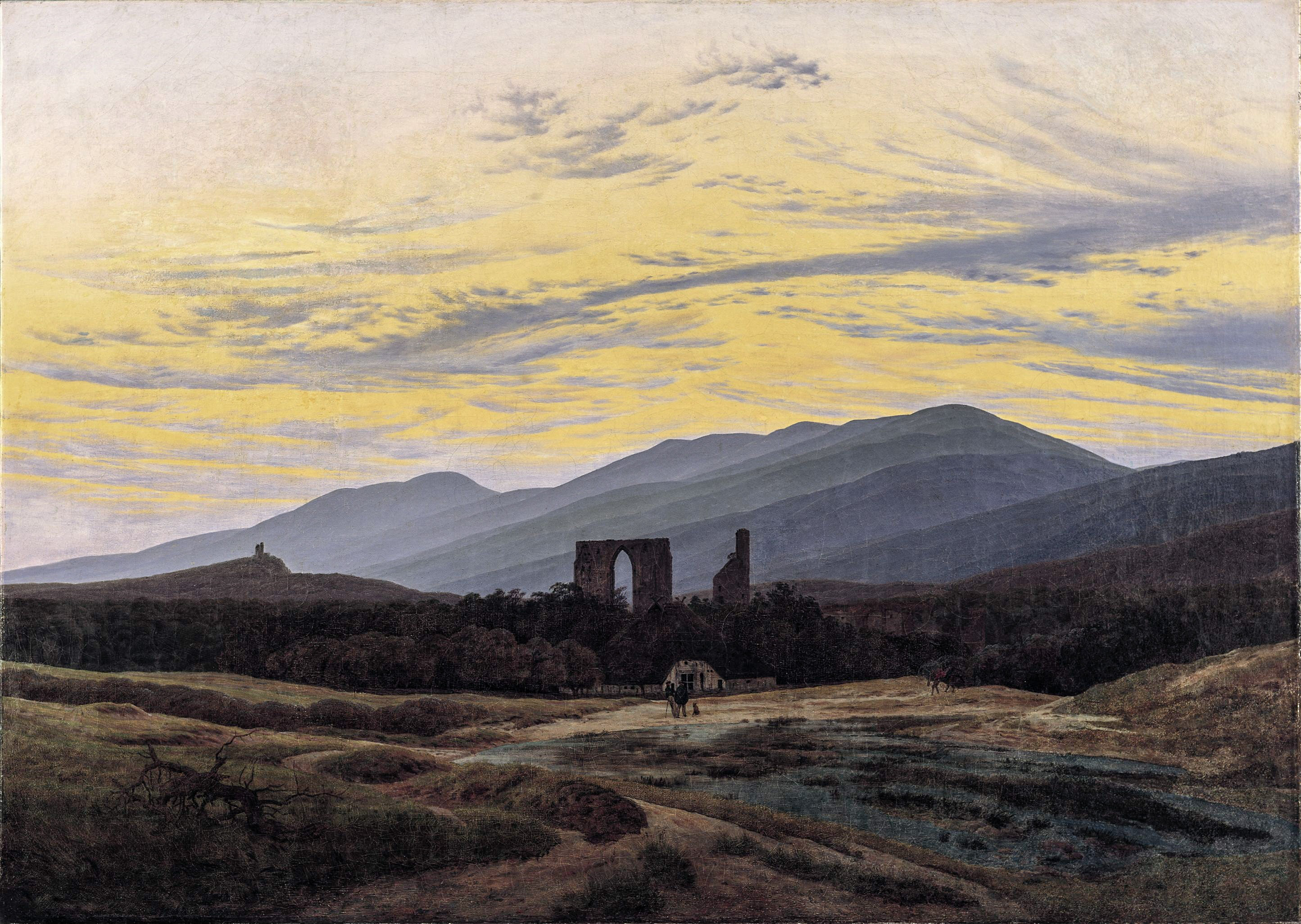
Ruins of Eldena Abbey in the Riesengebirge (1830–1834) by Caspar David Friedrich

Ruins of Eldena Abbey in the Riesengebirge or Ruins in the Riesengebirge is an 1830–1834 oil on canvas painting by Caspar David Friedrich, now in the Pommersches Landesmuseum in Greifswald. It shows the ruins of the Eldena Abbey in the Riesengebirge mountains.
