= Mirror galvanometer =

Type of ammeter

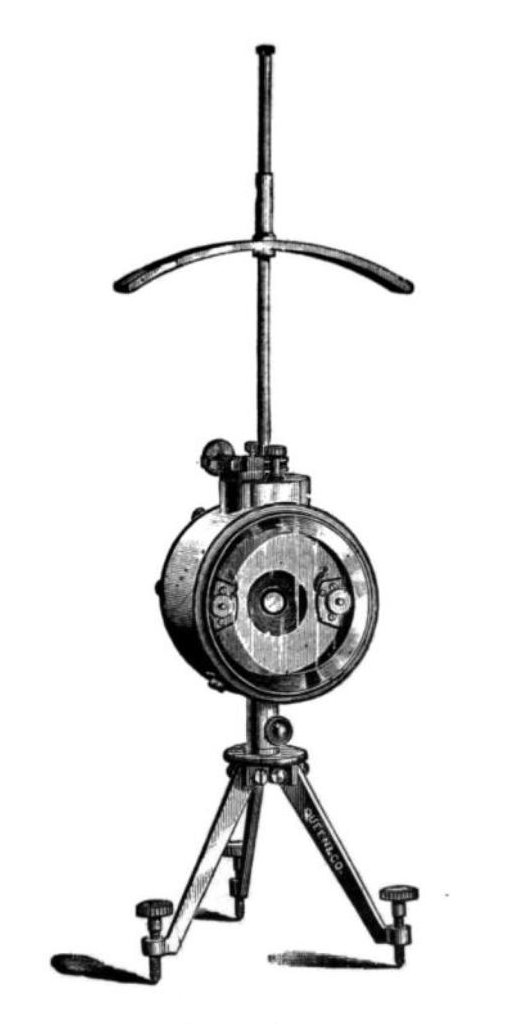
Thomson mirror galvanometer of tripod type, from around 1900

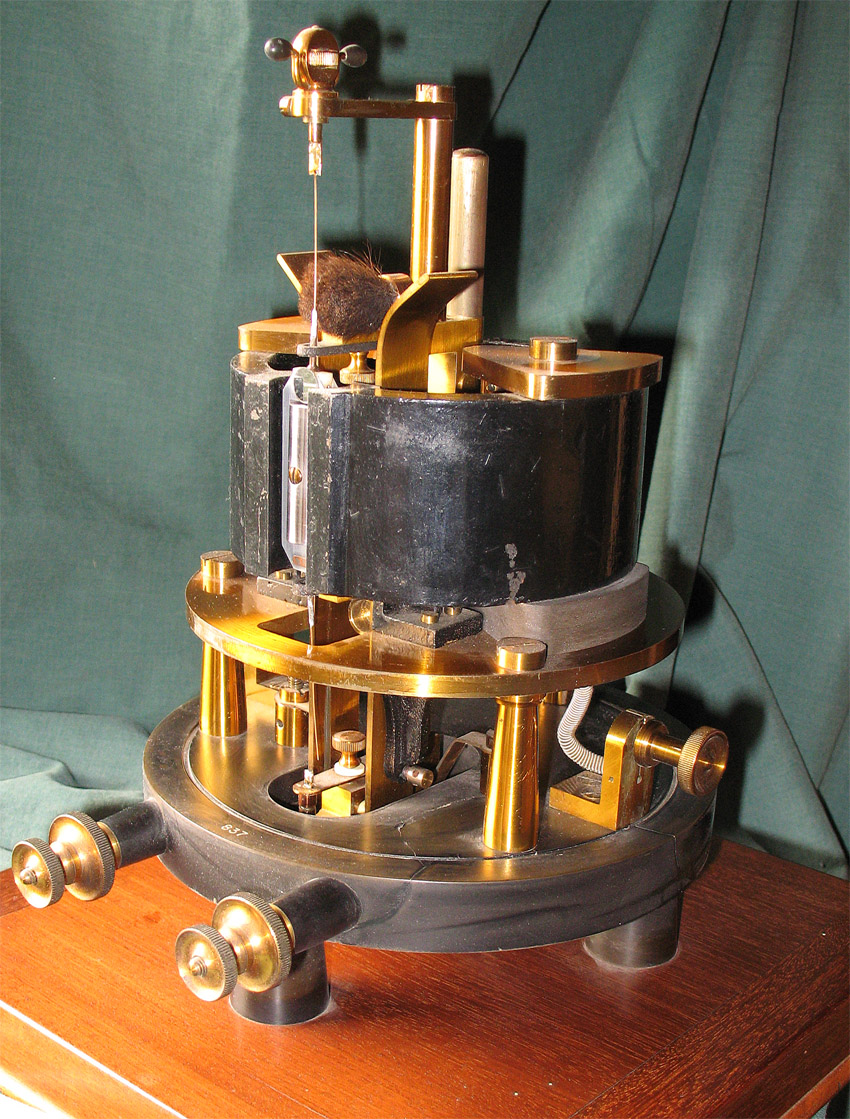
Galvanometer by H.W. Sullivan, London. Late 19th or early 20th century. This galvanometer was used at the transatlantic cable station, Halifax, NS, Canada

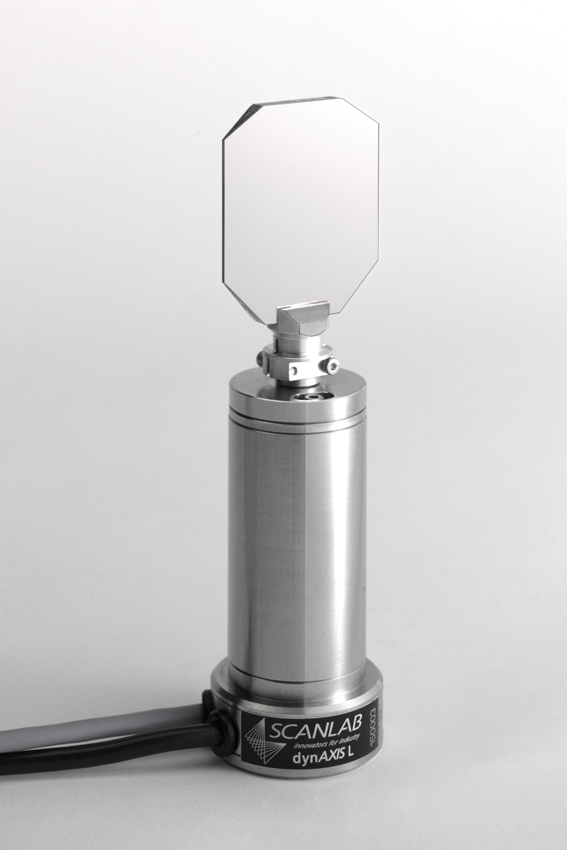
Modern mirror galvanometer from Scanlab

A mirror galvanometer is an ammeter that indicates it has sensed an electric current by deflecting a light beam with a mirror. The beam of light projected on a scale acts as a long massless pointer. In 1826, Johann Christian Poggendorff developed the mirror galvanometer for detecting electric currents. The apparatus is also known as a spot galvanometer after the spot of light produced in some models.

Mirror galvanometers were used extensively in scientific instruments before reliable, stable electronic amplifiers were available. The most common uses were as recording equipment for seismometers and submarine cables used for telegraphy.

In modern times, the term mirror galvanometer is also used for devices that move laser beams by rotating a mirror through a galvanometer set-up, often with a servo-like control loop. The name is often abbreviated as galvo.

== Kelvin's galvanometer ==
The mirror galvanometer was improved significantly by William Thomson, later to become Lord Kelvin. He coined the term mirror galvanometer and patented the device in 1858. Thomson intended the instrument to read weak signal currents on very long submarine telegraph cables. This instrument was far more sensitive than any which preceded it, enabling the detection of the slightest defect in the core of a cable during its manufacture and submersion.

Thomson decided that he needed an extremely sensitive instrument after he took part in the failed attempt to lay a transatlantic telegraph cable in 1857. He worked on the device while waiting for a new expedition the following year. He first looked at improving a galvanometer used by Hermann von Helmholtz to measure the speed of nerve signals in 1849. Helmholtz's galvanometer had a mirror fixed to the moving needle, which was used to project a beam of light onto the opposite wall, thus greatly amplifying the signal. Thomson intended to make this more sensitive by reducing the mass of the moving parts, but in a flash of inspiration while watching the light reflected from his monocle suspended around his neck, he realised that he could dispense with the needle and its mounting altogether. He instead used a small piece of mirrored glass with a small piece of magnetised steel glued on the back. This was suspended by a thread in the magnetic field of the fixed sensing coil. In a hurry to try the idea, Thomson first used a hair from his dog, but later used a silk thread from the dress of his niece Agnes.

The following is adapted from a contemporary account of Thomson's instrument:

The mirror galvanometer consists of a long fine coil of silk-covered copper wire. In the heart of that coil, within a little air-chamber, a small round mirror is hung by a single fibre of floss silk, with four tiny magnets cemented to its back. A beam of light is thrown from a lamp upon the mirror, and reflected by it upon a white screen or scale a few feet distant, where it forms a bright spot of light. When there is no current on the instrument, the spot of light remains stationary at the zero position on the screen; but the instant a current traverses the long wire of the coil, the suspended magnets twist themselves horizontally out of their former position, the mirror is inclined with them, and the beam of light is deflected along the screen to one side or the other, according to the nature of the current. If a positive electric current gives a deflection to the right of zero, a negative current will give a deflection to the left of zero, and vice versa.

The air in the little chamber surrounding the mirror is compressed at will, so as to act like a cushion, and deaden the movements of the mirror. The needle is thus prevented from idly swinging about at each deflection, and the separate signals are rendered abrupt. At a receiving station the current coming in from the cable has simply to be passed through the coil before it is sent into the ground, and the wandering light spot on the screen faithfully represents all its variations to the clerk, who, looking on, interprets these, and cries out the message word by word. The small weight of the mirror and magnets which form the moving part of this instrument, and the range to which the minute motions of the mirror can be magnified on the screen by the reflected beam of light, which acts as a long impalpable hand or pointer, render the mirror galvanometer marvellously sensitive to the current, especially when compared with other forms of receiving instruments. Messages could be sent from the United Kingdom to the United States through one Atlantic cable and back again through another, and there received on the mirror galvanometer, the electric current used being that from a toy battery made out of a lady's silver thimble, a grain of zinc, and a drop of acidulated water.

The practical advantage of this extreme delicacy is that the signal waves of the current may follow each other so closely as almost entirely to coalesce, leaving only a very slight rise and fall of their crests, like ripples on the surface of a flowing stream, and yet the light spot will respond to each. The main flow of the current will of course shift the zero of the spot, but over and above this change of place the spot will follow the momentary fluctuations of the current which form the individual signals of the message. What with this shifting of the zero and the very slight rise and fall in the current produced by rapid signalling, the ordinary land line instruments are quite unserviceable for work upon long cables.

== Moving coil galvanometer ==
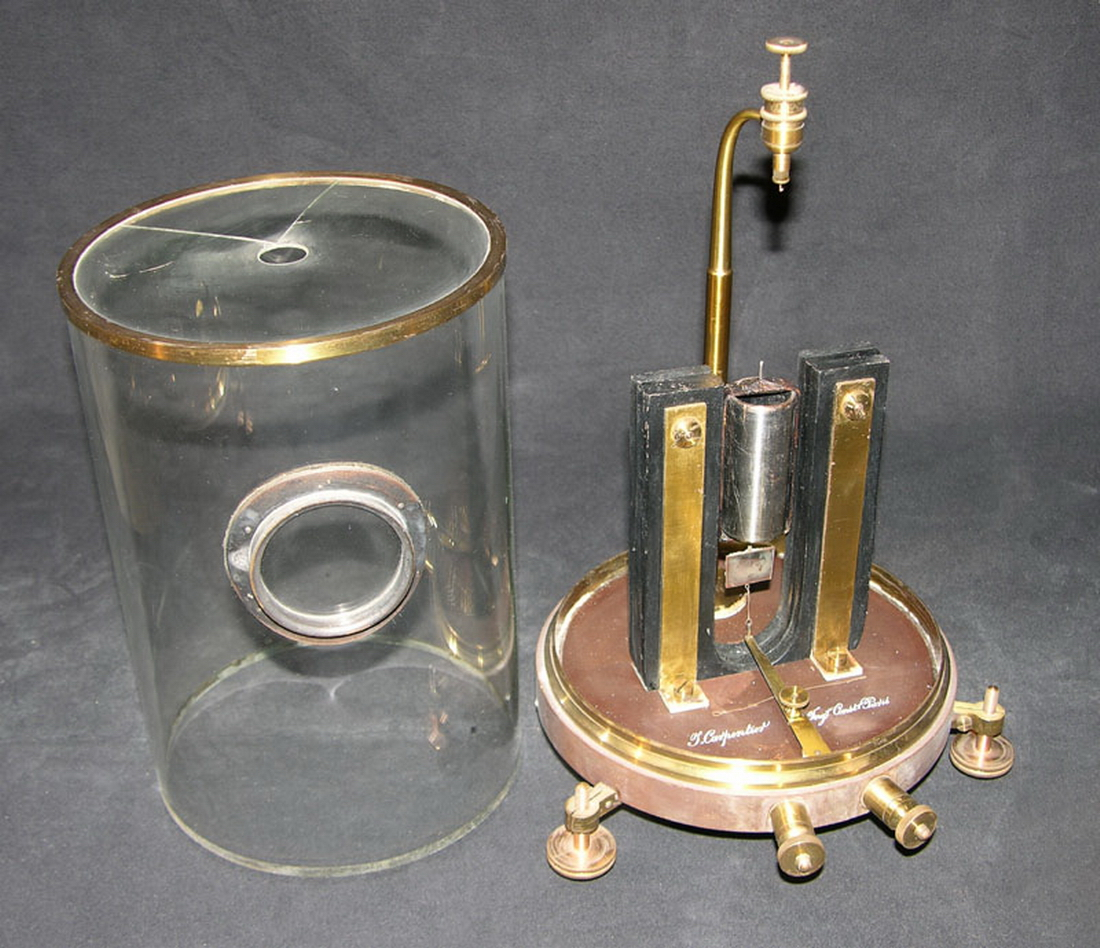
A moving coil galvanometer with its glass cover separated and mirror absent

Moving coil galvanometer was developed independently by Marcel Deprez and Jacques-Arsène d'Arsonval about 1880. Deprez's galvanometer was developed for high currents, while D'Arsonval designed his to measure weak currents. Unlike in the Kelvin's galvanometer, in this type of galvanometer the magnet is stationary and the coil is suspended in the magnet gap. The mirror attached to the coil frame rotates together with it. This form of instrument can be more sensitive and accurate and it replaced the Kelvin's galvanometer in most applications. The moving coil galvanometer is practically immune to ambient magnetic fields. Another important feature is self-damping generated by the electro-magnetic forces due to the currents induced in the coil by its movements the magnetic field. These are proportional to the angular velocity of the coil.

== Modern uses ==
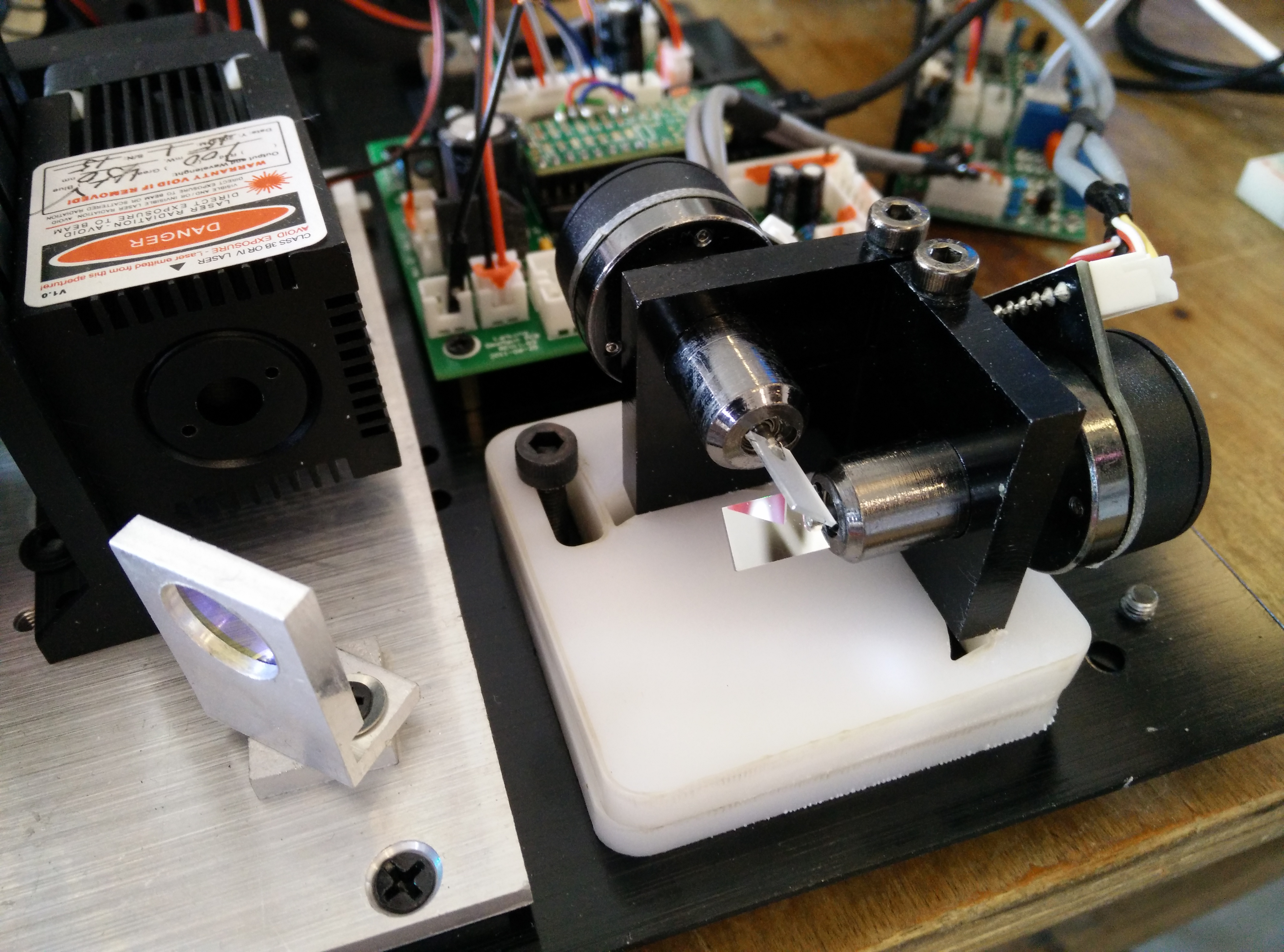
Mirror galvo in an RGB laser projector.

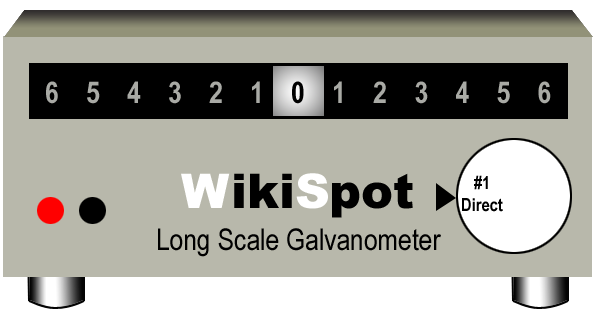
"EdSpot", a popular commercial mirror galvanometer, somewhat resembles this picture.

In modern times, high-speed mirror galvanometers are employed in laser light shows to move the laser beams and produce colorful geometric patterns in fog around the audience. Such high speed mirror galvanometers have proved to be indispensable in industry for laser marking systems for everything from laser etching hand tools, containers, and parts to batch-coding semiconductor wafers in semiconductor device fabrication. They typically control X and Y directions on Nd:YAG and CO_{2} laser markers to control the position of the infrared power laser spot. Laser ablation, laser beam machining and wafer dicing are all industrial areas where high-speed mirror galvanometers can be found.

This moving coil galvanometer is mainly used to measure very feeble or low currents of order 10^{−9} A.

To linearise the magnetic field across the coil throughout the galvanometer's range of movement, the d'Arsonval design of a soft iron cylinder is placed inside the coil without touching it. This gives a consistent radial field, rather than a parallel linear field.

== See also ==
- String galvanometer
