= Zöllner illusion =

Optical illusion

A version of the Zöllner illusion

The Zöllner illusion is an optical illusion named after its discoverer, German astrophysicist Johann Karl Friedrich Zöllner. In 1860, Zöllner sent his discovery in a letter to physicist and scholar Johann Christian Poggendorff, editor of Annalen der Physik und Chemie, who subsequently discovered the related Poggendorff illusion in Zöllner's original drawing.

One depiction of the illusion consists of a series of parallel diagonal lines which are crossed with short, repeating lines, the direction of the crossing lines alternating between horizontal and vertical. This creates the illusion that the longer lines are not parallel. The shorter lines are on an angle to the longer lines, and this angle helps to create the impression that one end of the longer lines is nearer to the viewer than the other end. This is similar to the way the Wundt illusion appears. It may be that the Zöllner illusion is caused by this impression of depth.

This illusion is similar to the Hering illusion, Poggendorff illusion, Müller-Lyer illusion, and Café wall illusion. All these illusions demonstrate how lines can seem to be distorted by their background.
