= Johann Christian Poggendorff =

German physicist (1796–1877)

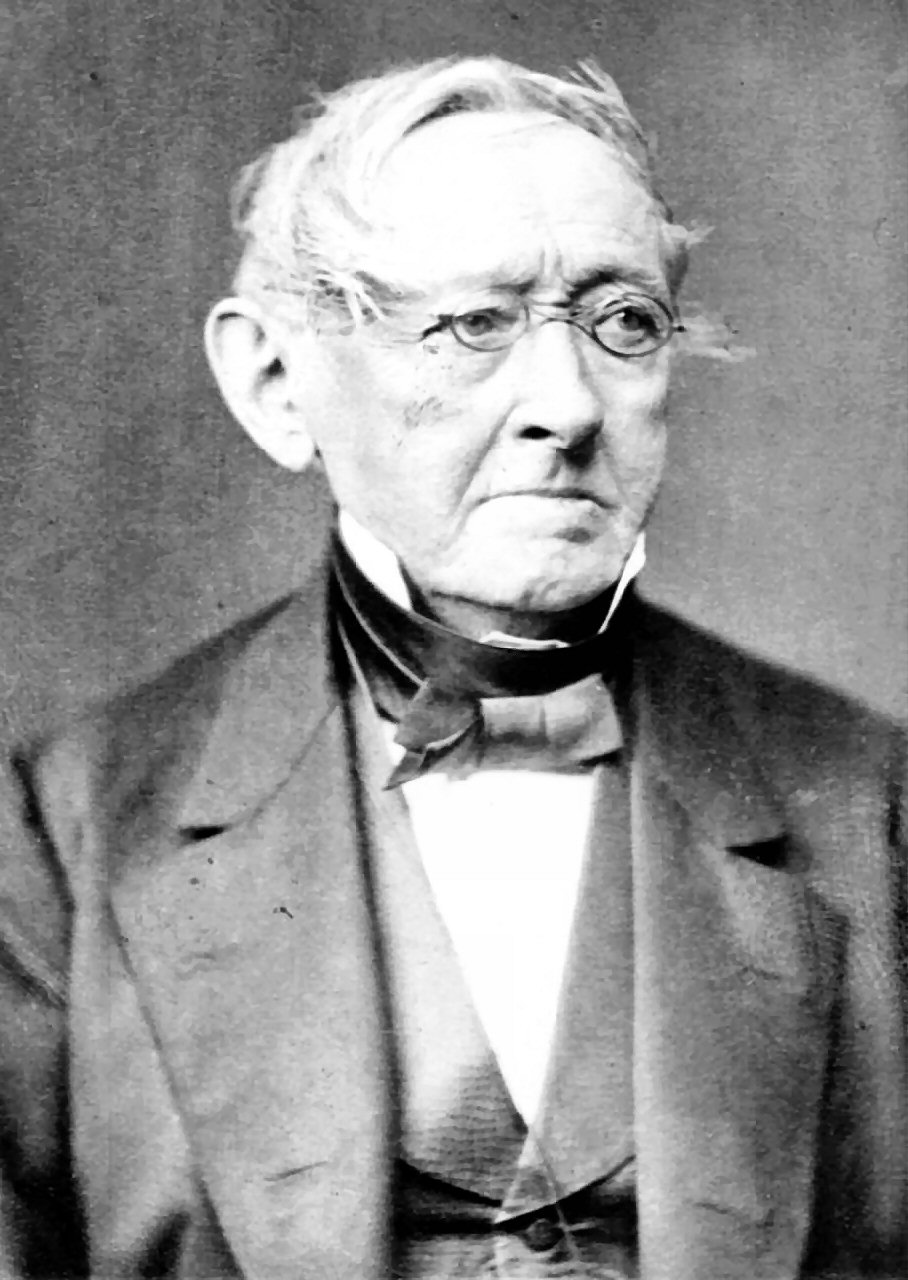
- Born: 29 December 1796; Hamburg
- Died: 24 January 1877 (aged 80); Berlin, German Empire
- Known for: Poggendorff cell Poggendorff illusion Mirror galvanometer Potentiometer
- Family: Valentin Rose (son in-law)

Johann Christian Poggendorff (29 December 1796 – 24 January 1877) was a German physicist born in Hamburg. Poggendorff is best known for his work related to electricity and magnetism, most notably the electrostatic motor which is analogous to Wilhelm Holtz's electrostatic machine. In 1841 he described the use of the potentiometer for measurement of electrical potentials without current draw.

== Biography ==
Poggendorf had apprenticed himself to an apothecary in Hamburg, and when twenty-two began to earn his living as an apothecary's assistant at Itzehoe. Ambition and a strong inclination towards a scientific career led him to move to Berlin. He entered Humboldt University in 1820, and in 1823 he was appointed meteorological observer to the Academy of Sciences.

Even at this early period he had conceived the idea of founding a physical and chemical scientific journal, and the realization of this plan was hastened by the sudden death of Ludwig Wilhelm Gilbert, the editor of Gilbert's Annalen der Physik, in 1824. Poggendorff immediately put himself in communication with the publisher, Barth of Leipzig. He became editor of Annalen der Physik und Chemie, which was to be a continuation of Gilbert's Annalen on a somewhat extended plan. Poggendorff edited the journal for 52 years, until 1876. In 1826, Poggendorff developed the mirror galvanometer, a device for detecting electric currents.

He was noted for his extensive scientific knowledge, encompassing both contemporary and historical scholarship, as well as for his emphasis on empirical evidence over speculative theory. His organisational approach to scientific work and editorial practice contributed to the development of rigorous experimental science. Under his editorship, Annalen der Physik und Chemie (commonly known as Poggendorff’s Annalen) became one of the leading scientific journals in Europe.

In the course of his fifty-two years editorship of the Annalen Poggendorff made many acquaintances in the scientific community. This knowledge, combined with what he had gathered by historical reading, was published in his Biographisch-literarisches Handworterbuch zur Geschichte der exacten Wissenschaften, containing details of the lives and scientific labors of mathematicians, astronomers, physicists, and chemists. The first two volumes were published in 1863; after his death a third volume appeared in 1898, covering the period 1858–1883, and a fourth in 1904, coming down to the beginning of the 20th century.

His literary and scientific reputation brought him several titles. In 1830 he was made royal professor, in 1838 Hon. Ph.D. and extraordinary professor in the University of Berlin, and in 1839 member of the Berlin Academy of Sciences. In 1845, he was elected a foreign member of the Royal Swedish Academy of Sciences. Many offers of ordinary professorships were made to him, but he declined them all, devoting himself to his duties as editor of the Annalen, and to the pursuit of his scientific researches. He died in Berlin on 24 January 1877.

His daughter Marie Poggendorff (born 12 August 1838) married Valentin Rose in 1872.

== Illusion ==
The Poggendorff Illusion is an optical illusion that involves the brain's perception of the interaction between diagonal lines and horizontal and vertical edges. It is named after Poggendorff, who discovered it in the drawing of Johann Karl Friedrich Zöllner, in which he showed the Zöllner illusion in 1860. In the adjacent picture, a straight black line is obscured by a dark gray rectangle. The black line appears disjointed, although it is in fact straight; the second picture illustrates this fact.

== See also ==
- Chromic acid cell

== Publications ==
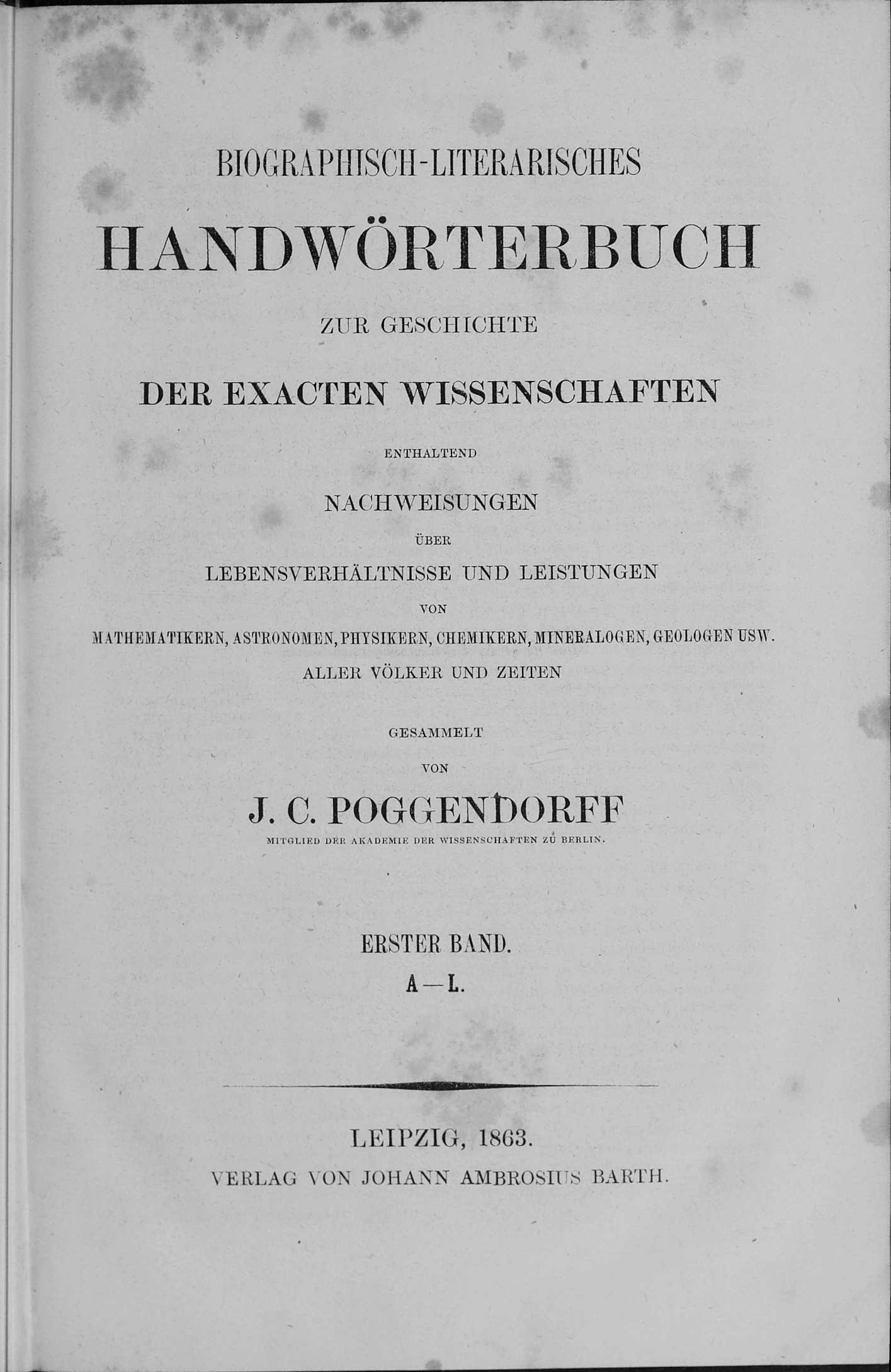
Biographisch-literarisches Handwörterbuch zur Geschichte der exakten Wissenschaften, 1863

- Biographisch-literarisches Handwörterbuch zur Geschichte der exakten Wissenschaften (in German). Vol. 1. Leipzig: Johann Ambrosius Barth. 1863.
  - Biographisch-literarisches Handwörterbuch zur Geschichte der exakten Wissenschaften (in German). Vol. 2. Leipzig: Johann Ambrosius Barth. 1863.
  - Biographisch-literarisches Handwörterbuch zur Geschichte der exakten Wissenschaften (in German). Vol. 3. Leipzig: Johann Ambrosius Barth. 1898.
  - Biographisch-literarisches Handwörterbuch zur Geschichte der exakten Wissenschaften (in German). Vol. 4. Leipzig: Johann Ambrosius Barth. 1904.
- J. C. Poggendorff, Annalen Der Physik, Ser. 2, Vol. 139, pp 513–546 (1870)
- J. C. Poggendorff, "Biographisch-Literarisches Handwörterbuch der exakten Naturwissenschaften" "(Tr. "biographic-literary hand dictionary of the exact sciences"). Johann Ambrosius Barth, Leipzig, 1863. Two volumes, Band 2 (M-Z) at Google Books (weitergeführt in den Bänden III bis VIII durch die Sächsische Akademie der Wissenschaften zu Leipzig)
- Biographisch-Literarisches Handwörterbuch
- Emil Frommel, Johann Christian Poggendorff (Berlin, 1877)
- Lebenslinien zur Geschichte der exacten Wissenschaften seit Wiederherstellung derselben. Alexander Duncker, Berlin 1853. Johann Christian Poggendorff at Google Books
- Geschichte der Physik. Joh. Ambr. Barth, Leipzig 1879. US at Google Books, US at Google Books, at the Internet Archive
