= Johann Karl Friedrich Zöllner =

German astrophysicist

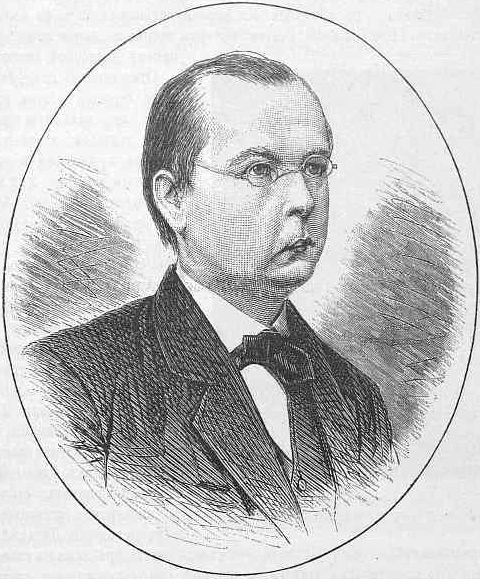
Johann Karl Friedrich Zöllner

Johann Karl Friedrich Zöllner (8 November 1834 – 25 April 1882) was a German astrophysicist who studied optical illusions. He was also an early psychical investigator. He discovered the Zöllner illusion where lines that are parallel appear diagonal.

Zöllner illusion, parallel line pattern that creates the optical illusion that the longer lines are not parallel.

In astronomy, he proved Doppler effect in stars and made the first measurement of the apparent magnitude of the Sun.

He is also known for his scientific experiments about spiritualism, studying the work of the medium Henry Slade.

== Biography ==
Johann Karl Friedrich Zöllner was born in Berlin in 1834.

He obtained is doctorate in the University of Basel in 1859, studying photometry. His advisor was Gustav Heinrich Wiedemann.

From 1872 he held the chair of astrophysics at Leipzig University.

Zöllner died in Leipzig in 1882.

== Research ==
He wrote numerous papers on photometry and spectrum analysis in Johann Christian Poggendorff's Annalen and Berichte der k. sächsischen Gesellschaft der Wissenschaften, two works on celestial photometry (Grundzüge einer allgemeinen Photometrie des Himmels, Berlin, 1861, 4to, and Photometrische Untersuchungen, Leipzig, 1865, 8vo), and a curious book, Ueber die Natur der Cometen (Leipzig, 1872, 3rd ed. 1883).

=== Astrophysics ===
He also successfully proved Christian Doppler's theory on the effect of motion of the color of stars, and the resulting shift of absorption lines, via the invention of a very sensitive spectroscope which he named "Reversionspectroscope". He had shown also that the red-shift was in addition caused by variation in the stars' lights intensities with the help of his "Astrophotometer".

In 1867 he made the first measurement of the Sun's apparent magnitude, using a particular "telescope / photometer" he designed. The instrument was able to superimpose two images, one from a small telescope and the second from a reference lamp. During daytime he dimmed the image of the Sun (using polarizers and diaphragms) and compared it to the lamp. During nighttime, the lamp was dimmed and compared to bright stars. He estimated the visual magnitude of the Sun to be -26.66, an extraordinary result for the time. Today's accepted value is -26.74. This measure is very difficult, since the flux difference between the Sun and Capella (one of the bright stars he used) is roughly 50 billion times.

This work was pivotal for astrophysics - leading to the discovery that star's brightness varies wildly among different stars, and also that the Sun is brighter than the vast majority of nearby stars.

== Experiments on spiritualism ==
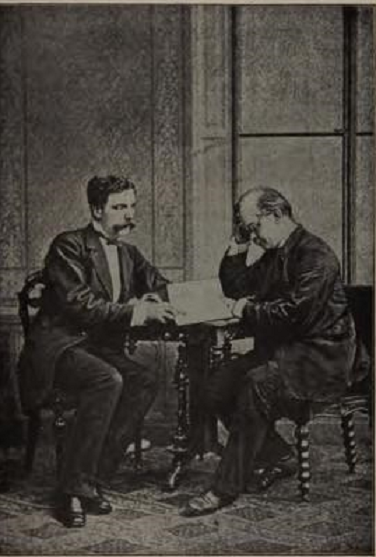
Henry Slade with Zöllner

Zöllner first became interested in spiritualism in 1875 when he visited the scientist William Crookes in England. Zöllner wanted a physical scientific explanation for the phenomena and came to the conclusion that physics of a four-dimensional space may explain spiritualism. Zöllner attempted to demonstrate that spirits are four-dimensional and set up his own séance experiments with the medium Henry Slade which involved slate-writing, tying knots on string, recovering coins from sealed boxes and the interlinking of two wooden rings. These experiments occurred in November and December 1877 at Zöllner's home in Leipzig. He invited the scientists Wilhelm Eduard Weber, Gustav Fechner, Wilhelm Scheibner and Wilhelm Wundt to some of the sittings.

The experiments were recorded by Zöllner in a book titled Transcendental Physics in 1878. According to Zöllner some of the experiments were a success. However, critics have suggested that the medium Henry Slade was a fraud who performed trickery in the experiments. Wilhelm Wundt who attended one of the séances, claimed that the conditions and controls were unsatisfactory. He also found the German grammatical errors on the slates suspicious as Slade was an English speaker.

Slade failed the experiment regarding the interlinking of two wooden rings. Instead, it was discovered that the two rings were passed onto a table leg. This impressed Zöllner but magicians noted that such a feat is easily explainable by trick methods.

In 1879, Hermann Ulrici brought Zollner's experiments to the attention of scientists in Germany by describing them in an academic journal. This caused a heated controversy. Wundt published a rejoinder to Ulrici, denouncing the experiments and spiritualism as non-scientific. Enraged, Zöllner attacked Wundt and threatened him with a lawsuit. Zöllner went as far as claiming that Wundt was possessed by evil spirits.

George Stuart Fullerton, the secretary of the Seybert Commission, claimed that Zöllner had an "unsound mind" at the time of the experiments.

Carl Willmann, an inventor of magical apparatus, strongly suspected that Slade had cheated. In the case of sealed slates, he suggested they could have easily been opened by a thin wire.

Psychical researcher Hereward Carrington in his book The Physical Phenomena of Spiritualism (1907) revealed fraudulent methods (with diagrams of the rope tricks) that Slade may have utilized in the experiments. Psychologist Ray Hyman has noted:

In the case of Zöllner's investigations of Slade, not only do we know that Slade was exposed before and after his sessions with Zöllner, but also there is ample reason to raise questions about the adequacy of the investigation. Carrington (1907), Podmore (1963), and Mrs. Sidgwick (1886-87) are among a number of critics who have uncovered flaws and loopholes in Zöllner's sittings with Slade.

Science writer Martin Gardner also exposed the tricks of Slade with diagrams and commented that "Zöllner did some good work in spectrum analysis, but he was supremely ignorant of conjuring methods. As a consequence he was badly taken in, I'm afraid, by Henry Slade."

== Honors ==
The lunar crater Zöllner is named in his honor.

In 1934, botanist Josef Velenovský published a genus of fungi named Zoellneria (in the family Sclerotiniaceae) and named in Zöllner's honour. Also several other plant species, have been named in his honour including; Alstroemeria zoellneri, Baccharis zoellneri, Chenopodium zoellneri and Pseudolucia zoellneri.

== Publications ==
- Transcendental Physics (English edition, translated by Charles Massey, 1880)
