= Bourdon illusion =

Bourdon illusion

Different illusion effects

The Bourdon illusion is an angle illusion named after the French psychologist Benjamin B. Bourdon. Bourdon lived from 1860 to 1943 and studied, among other things, optical illusions.

The illusion he presents consists of the fact that AE is a line segment, but it is perceived as being slightly bent around C in the same direction as the line segment BCD.

If the figure is rotated 45° to the right in succession, the illusion is more pronounced for the three non-horizontal figures than for the two horizontal figures.

== Literature ==
- Benjamin Bourdon: La perception visuelle de l'espace, Schleicher Frères publishing house, Paris, 1902
- James T. Walker, Matthew D. Shank: The Bourdon illusion in subjective contours, Perception & Psychophysics, 42 (1), 15–24 (1987)
- R. H. Day: The Bourdon illusion in haptic space, Perception & Psychophysics, 47, 400–404 (1990)
