= Ludwig Wilhelm Gilbert =

German scientist (1769–1824)

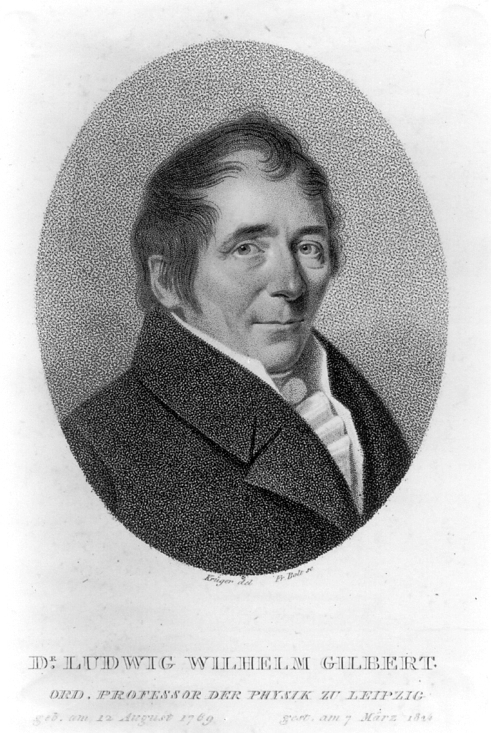
- Born: 12 August 1769; Berlin
- Died: 7 March 1824 (aged 54); Leipzig
- Citizenship: German
- Education: University of Halle
- Known for: Annalen der Physik
- Scientific career
- Fields: Physics, Chemistry
- Workplaces: University of Leipzig

Ludwig Wilhelm Gilbert (August 12, 1769 – March 7, 1824) was a German physicist and chemist, and professor of physics at the University of Leipzig. From 1799-1824, he published the "Annalen der Physik", of which Poggendorffs "Annalen der Physik und Chemie" was a continuation.

== Biography ==
Gilbert was born in Berlin. After studying mathematics and geography in the University of Halle, he was appointed as professor in 1795. In 1811, he was appointed as professor of physics at the University of Leipzig, and remained in that post until his death. He died in Leipzig.

Since 1816, he had been a correspondent of the Royal Institute of the Netherlands.

== Sources ==
Ludwig Wilhelm Gilbert
