= Neubrandenburg Burning =

1830–1835 painting by Caspar David Friedrich

Neubrandenburg Burning (Das brennende Neubrandenburg)
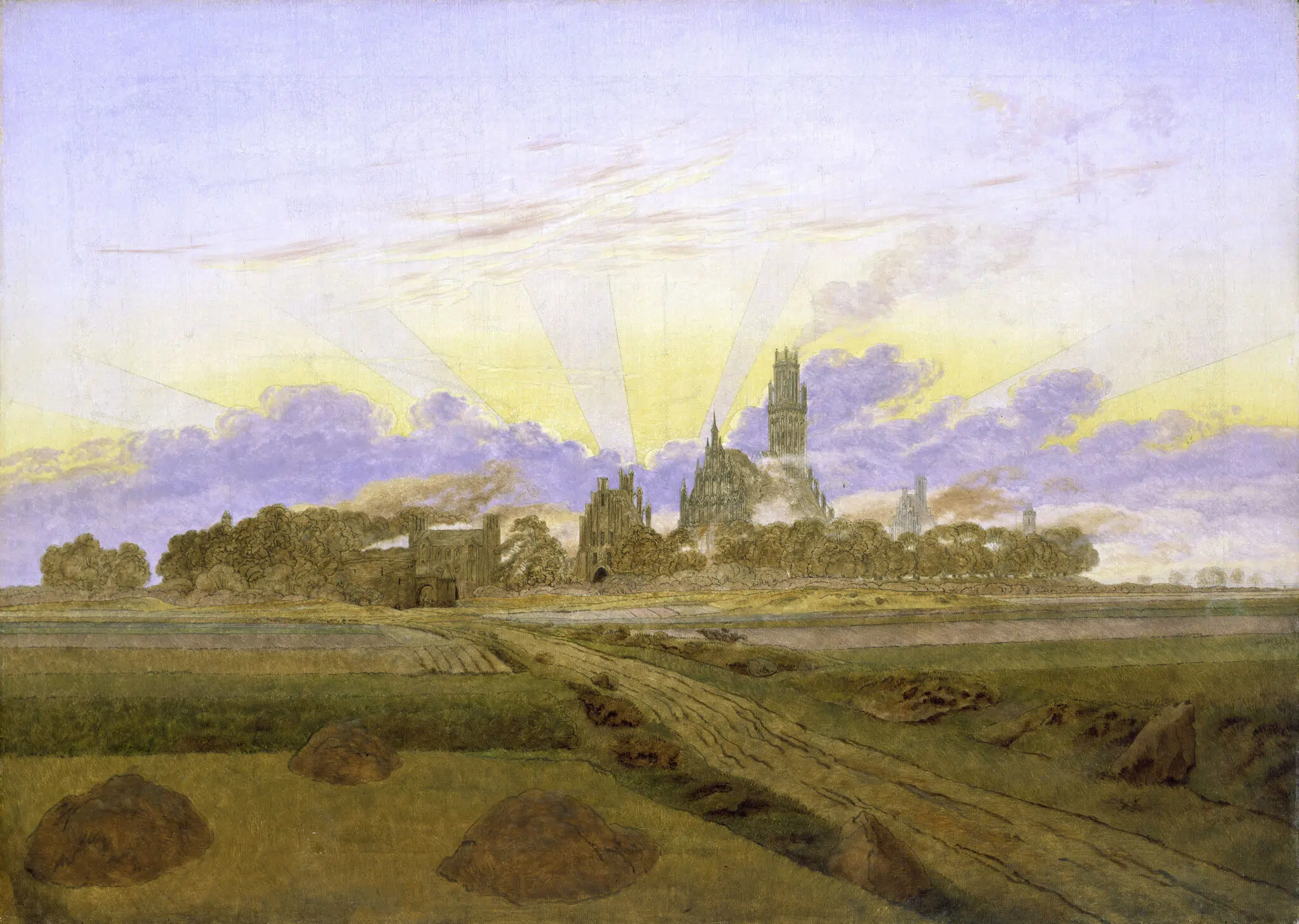
- Artist: Caspar David Friedrich
- Year: 1830–1835
- Medium: oil on canvas
- Dimensions: 72.2 cm × 101.3 cm (28.4 in × 39.9 in)
- Location: Hamburger Kunsthalle; Hamburg
- Accession: HK-1050

Neubrandenburg Burning (German - Das brennende Neubrandenburg), dated around 1834, is an oil on canvas painting by Caspar David Friedrich, now in the Hamburg Kunsthalle.

It is also known as Sunrise at Neubrandenburg (Sonnenaufgang bei Neubrandenburg) or Sunset at Neubrandenburg (Sonnenuntergang bei Neubrandenburg). The artist's parents were both born in Neubrandenburg and he often painted it - another example is Neubrandenburg.

== See also ==
- List of works by Caspar David Friedrich
