= Annalen der Physik =

- Discipline: Physics
- Language: English
- Edited by: Stefan Hildebrandt

Publication details
- History: 1799–present
- Publisher: Wiley-VCH
- Frequency: Monthly
- Impact factor: 2.5 (2024)

Standard abbreviations
- ISO 4: Ann. Phys. (Berl.)
- MathSciNet: Ann. Phys.
- NLM: Ann Phys

Indexing
- ISSN: 0003-3804 (print); 1521-3889 (web)
- LCCN: 50013519
- OCLC no.: 5854993

Links
- Journal homepage; Online access; Online archive; Free archive (1799–1940)

Annalen der Physik (English: Annals of Physics) is one of the oldest scientific journals on physics; it has been published since 1799. The journal publishes original, peer-reviewed papers on experimental, theoretical, applied, and mathematical physics and related areas. The editor-in-chief is Stefan Hildebrandt. Prior to 2008, its ISO 4 abbreviation was Ann. Phys. (Leipzig), after 2008 it became Ann. Phys. (Berl.).

The journal is the successor to Journal der Physik, published from 1790 until 1794, and Neues Journal der Physik, published from 1795 until 1797. The journal has been published under a variety of names (Annalen der Physik, Annalen der Physik und der physikalischen Chemie, Annalen der Physik und Chemie, Wiedemann's Annalen der Physik und Chemie) during its history.

== History ==
Originally, Annalen der Physik was published in German, then a leading scientific language. From the 1950s to the 1980s, the journal published in both German and English. Initially, only foreign authors contributed articles in English but from the 1970s German-speaking authors increasingly wrote in English in order to reach an international audience. After the German reunification in 1990, English became the only language of the journal.

The importance of Annalen der Physik unquestionably peaked in 1905 with Albert Einstein's Annus Mirabilis papers. In the 1920s, the journal lost ground to the concurrent Zeitschrift für Physik. With the 1933 emigration wave, German-language journals lost many of their best authors. During Nazi Germany, it was considered to represent "the more conservative elements within the German physics community", alongside Physikalische Zeitschrift. Between 1944 and 1946 publication ceased due to World War II. Granted permission to restart by Soviet military authorities in August 1946, the journal subsequently maintained a policy until 1992 of co-editorship by one person from East Germany and one from West Germany. After German reunification, the journal was acquired by Wiley-VCH.

A relaunch of the journal with new editor and new contents was announced for 2012. As a result of the 2012 relaunch, Annalen der Physik changed scope and updated the membership of the editorial board.

=== Editors ===
The early editors-in-chief were:

- Friedrich Albrecht Carl Gren (1790–1797) (as Journal der Physik and Neues Journal der Physik)
- Ludwig Wilhelm Gilbert (1799–1824) (as Annalen der Physik and Annalen der Physik und der physikalischen Chemie)
- Johann Christian Poggendorff (1824–1876) (as Annalen der Physik und Chemie)
- Gustav Heinrich Wiedemann (1877–1899) (as Annalen der Physik und Chemie)
- Paul Karl Ludwig Drude (1900–1906) (as Annalen der Physik)

With each editor, the numbering of volumes restarted from 1 (co-existent with a continuous numbering, a perpetual source of confusion). The journal was often referred to by the editor's name: Gilberts Annalen, Poggendorfs Annalen, Wiedemanns Annalen and so on, or for short Pogg. Ann., Wied. Ann.

After Drude, the work was divided between two editors: experimentalists Wilhelm Wien (1907–1928) and Eduard Grüneisen (1929–1949) and theoretician Max Planck (1907–1943, who had been associate editor from 1895).

In these times, peer-review was not yet standard. Einstein, for example, just sent his manuscripts to Planck, who then published them.

=== Notable published works ===
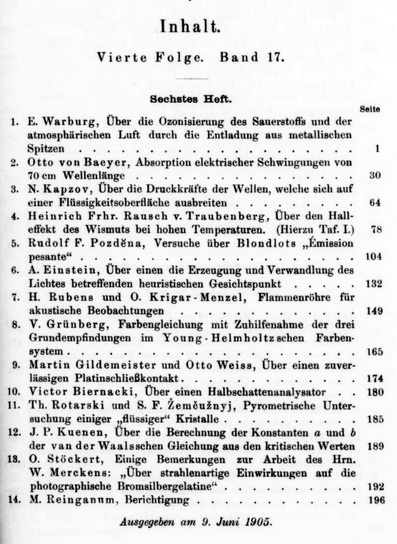
The table of contents of the Annalen der Physics from June 1905. Einstein's paper on the photoelectric effect is sixth on this list.

Some of the most famous papers published in Annalen der Physik were:

- on solving the equations that arise in electrical circuit analysis by Gustav Kirchhoff (1847),
- on stretched exponential relaxation by Rudolf Kohlrausch (1854),
- on stretched exponential relaxation by Friedrich Kohlrausch (1863,1876),
- on the photoelectric effect by Heinrich Hertz (1887),
- on blackbody radiation by Max Planck (1901),
- on capillarity by Albert Einstein (1901),
- the Annus Mirabilis papers by Albert Einstein on photons and the photoelectric effect, Brownian motion, on mass–energy equivalence, and the special theory of relativity (1905)
- on the heat capacities of solids with quantized energy levels by Einstein (1907),
- on molecular motion near absolute zero by Einstein and Otto Stern (1913),
- on the general theory of relativity by Einstein (1916)

== Abstracting and indexing ==
The journal is abstracted and indexed in:

- Chemical Abstracts Service
- Compendex
- Current Contents/Physical, Chemical & Earth Sciences
- FIZ Karlsruhe Databases
- International Nuclear Information System Database
- INSPEC
- Mathematical Reviews/MathSciNet
- Science Citation Index
- Scopus
- VINITI
- Zentralblatt MATH/Mathematics Abstracts

According to the Journal Citation Reports, the journal has a 2024 impact factor of 2.5.

== See also ==
- List of physics journals
