= Pomeranian State Museum =

Museum in Greifswald, Germany

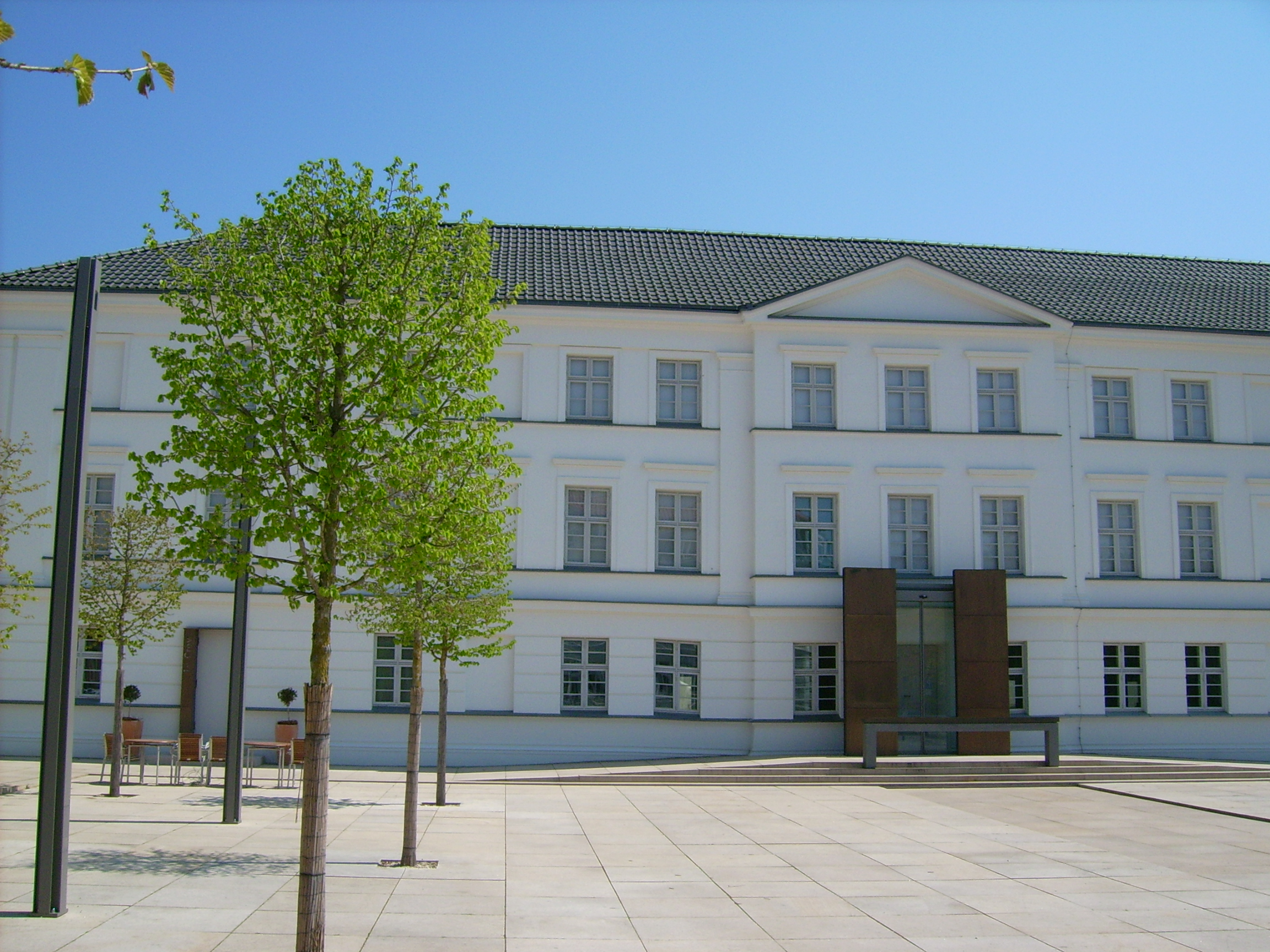
- Main entrance (west)
- Interactive fullscreen map
- Location: Greifswald, Germany
- Coordinates: 54°05′41″N 13°22′57″E

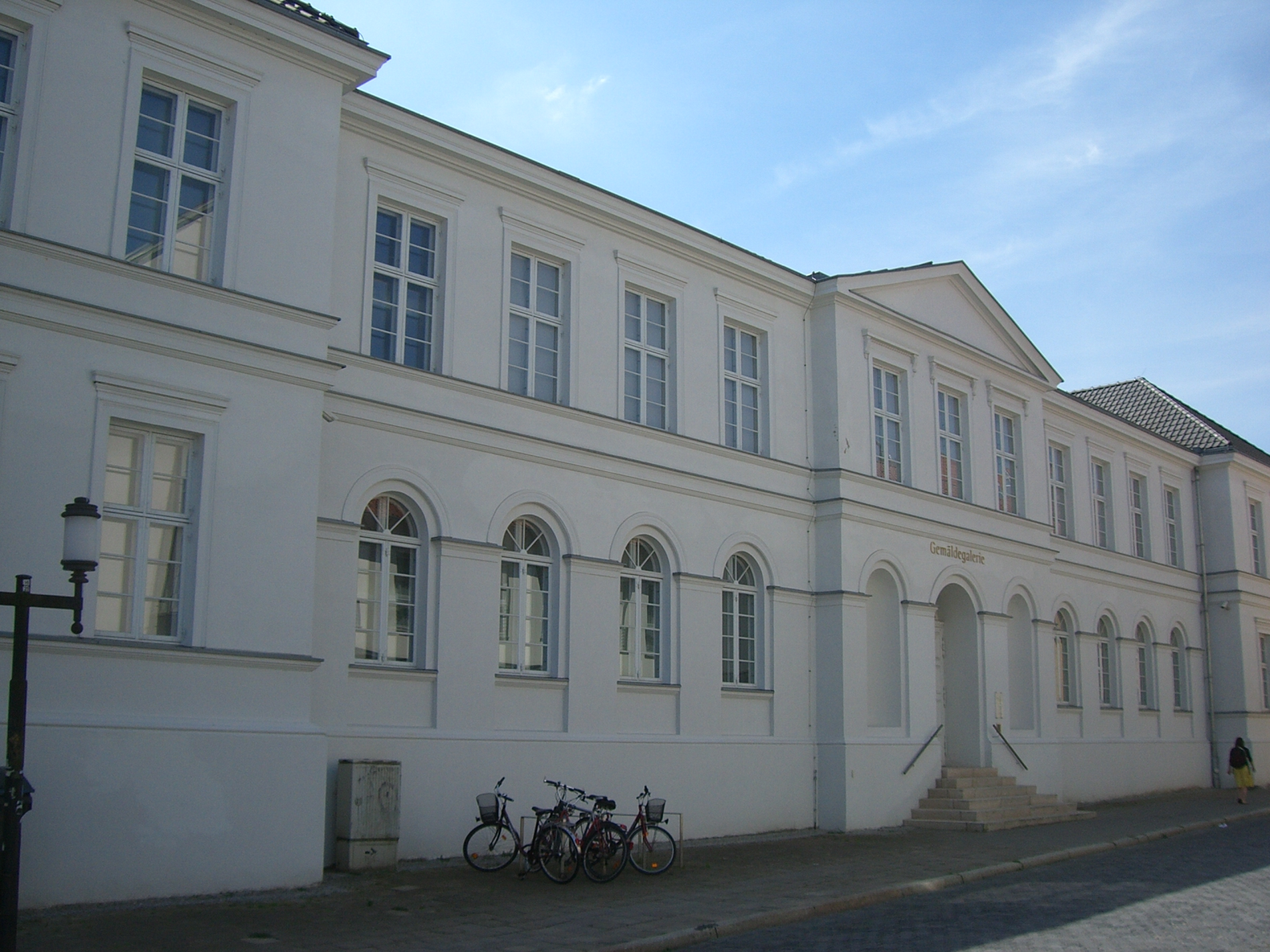
Gallery (north)

Pomeranian State Museum, Greifswald

The Pomeranian State Museum (German: Pommersches Landesmuseum) is a public museum in Greifswald in Western Pomerania, Germany. It is primarily dedicated to the history of Pomerania and arts. The largest exhibitions show archaeological findings and artefacts from the Pomerania region and paintings, e.g. of Caspar David Friedrich, a Greifswald local, such as Ruins of Eldena Abbey in the Riesengebirge. The museum was established in the years of 1998 to 2005 at the site of the historical Franciscan abbey.

Near Binz on the nearby isle of Rügen, a satellite of the museum is under construction at Jagdschloss Granitz, a former hunting lodge of the Rugian princes. This branch will be designated to Rugian history.

An early 20th-century museum in Stettin, then capital of the Province of Pomerania (now Szczecin, Poland), was the "Provinzialmuseum pommerscher Altertümer", which was also named "Pommersches Landesmuseum" (Pomerania State Museum) since 1934.

== Gallery ==
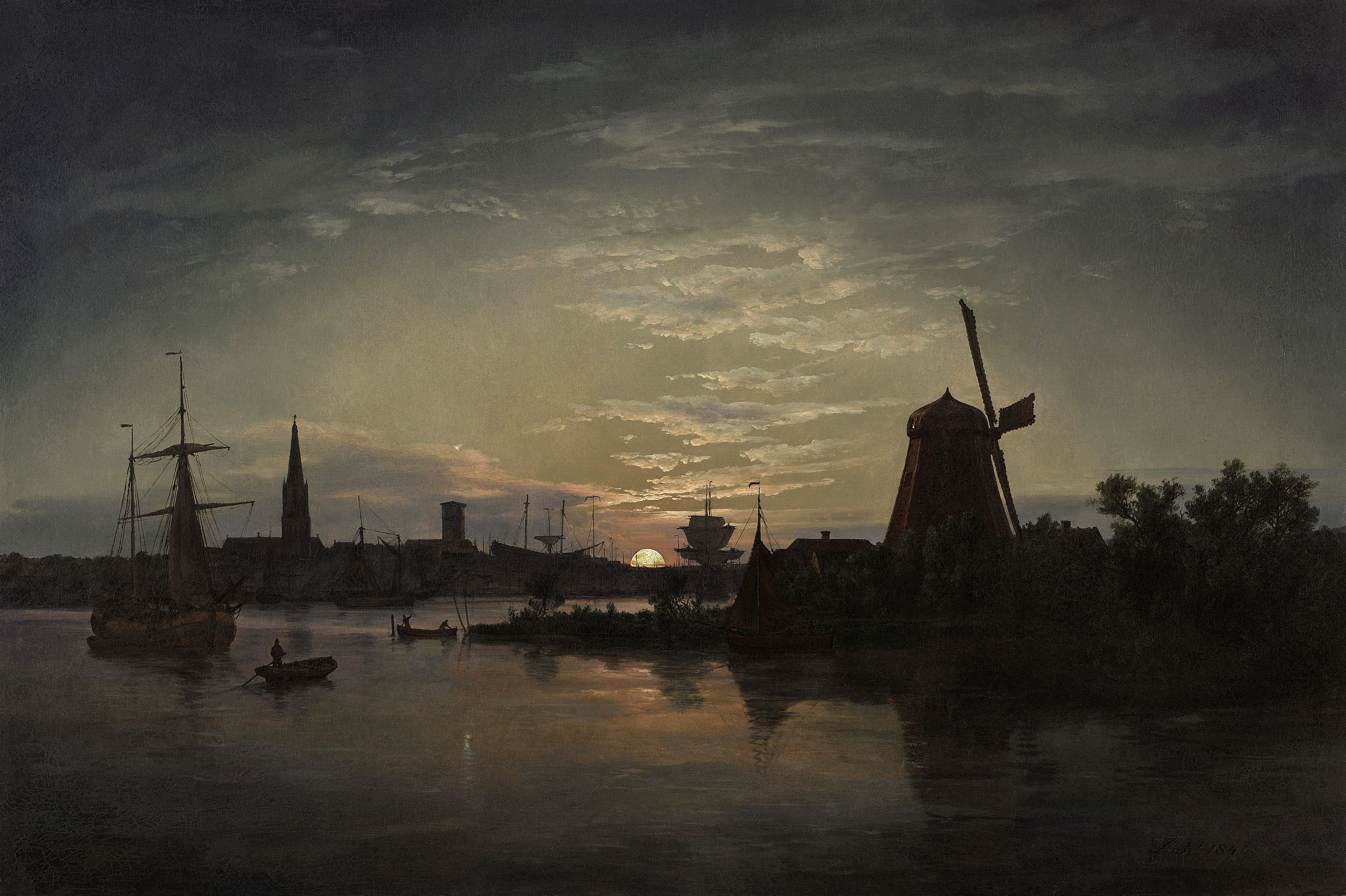
Johan Christian Claussen Dahl

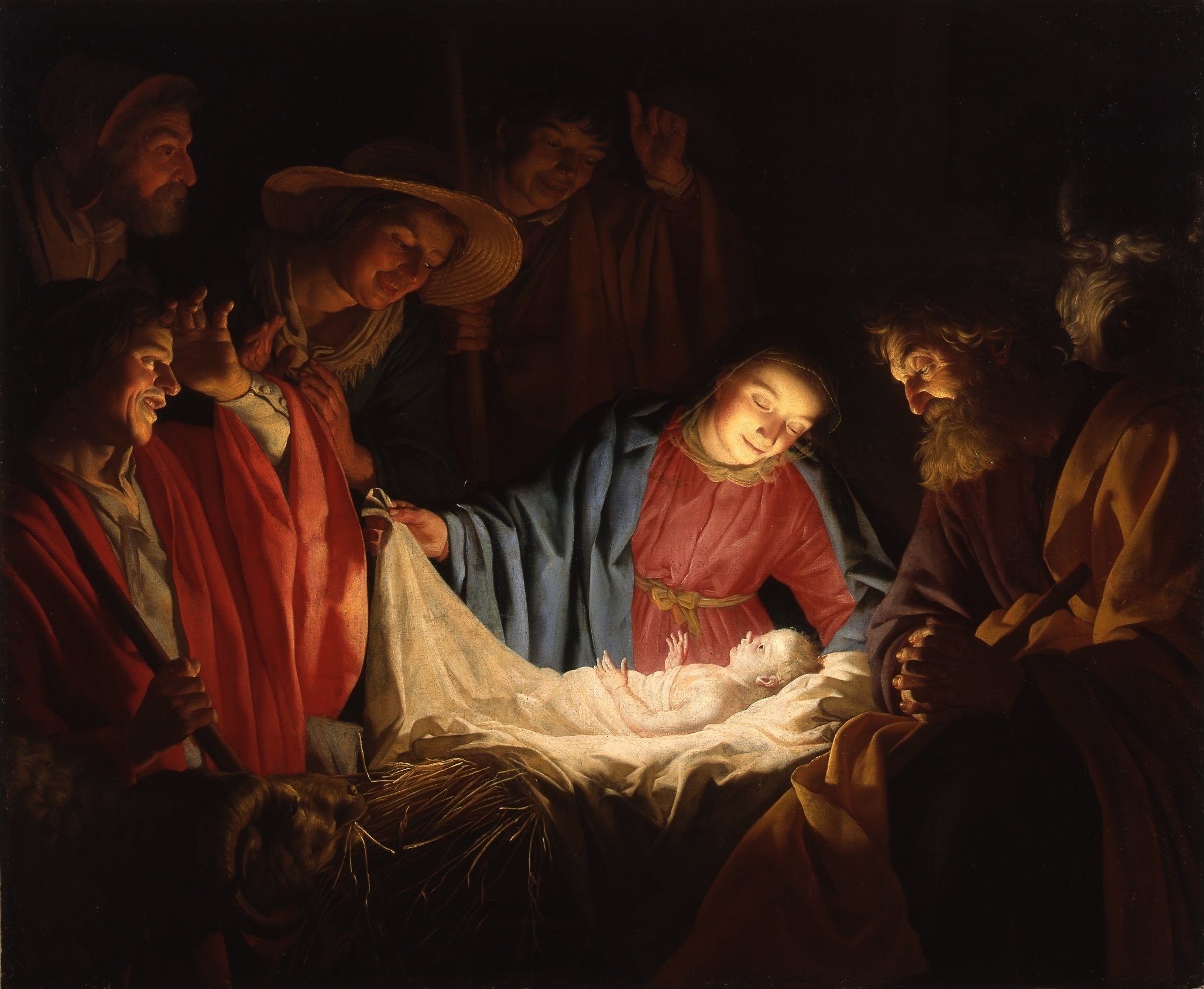
Gerard van Honthorst
