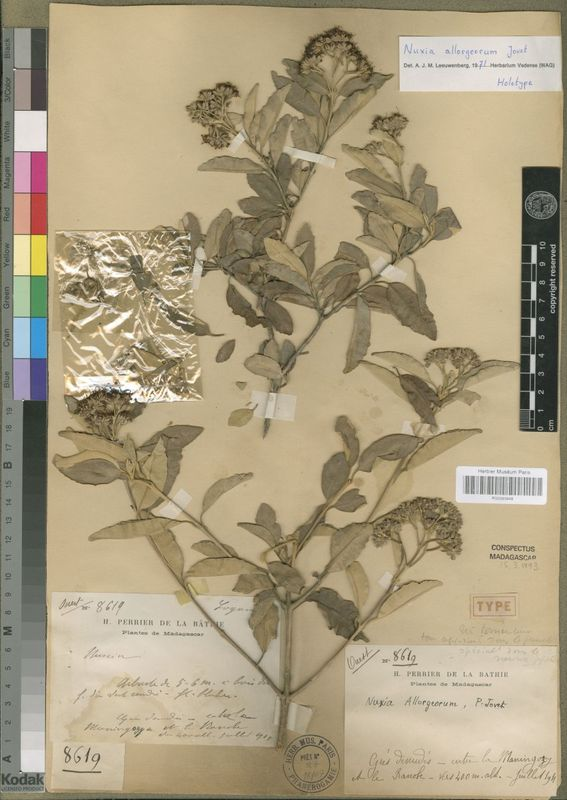
- Holotype

Conservation status
- Data Deficient (IUCN 3.1)

Scientific classification
- Kingdom: Plantae
- Clade: Embryophytes
- Clade: Tracheophytes
- Clade: Spermatophytes
- Clade: Angiosperms
- Clade: Eudicots
- Clade: Asterids
- Order: Lamiales
- Family: Stilbaceae
- Genus: Nuxia
- Species: N. allorgeorum

Binomial name
- Nuxia allorgeorum Jovet

= Nuxia allorgeorum =

Species of flowering plant

Nuxia allorgeorum is a species of flowering plant in the family Stilbaceae. It is a shrub or tree, known from a single specimen collected in Madagascar. The species was described in 1947, and is listed as Data Deficient by the International Union for the Conservation of Nature.

== Taxonomy ==
Nuxia allorgeorum was described by Paul Albert Jovet in 1947. The species is only known from the type specimen, which was collected in 1911, from the Mahajanga district of Madagascar, at an elevation of 400 metres (1,300 ft). The precise location from which it was collected is unknown, but is "between Maningozy and Ranobe".

== Distribution ==
Nuxia allorgeorum is native to the seasonally dry tropical biome of western Madagascar. It probably grows in dry savannahs.

== Description ==
Nuxia allorgeorum is a shrub or tree. It grows up to 6 metres (20 ft) tall. The inflorescences are round clusters. The flowers are around 7 millimetres (0.28 in) deep.

== Conservation ==
In 2020, the IUCN assessed Nuxia allorgeorum as Data Deficient, due to a lack of data on population trends. It may be impacted by grazing and wildfires. The species is not known to be present in any ex situ collections.

== Etymology ==
The species is named after Pierre Allorge and Valentine Allorge.
