= Allorge =

Allorge may refer to:

- Lucile Allorge (born 1937), Madagascar-born French botanist
- Pierre Allorge (1891–1944), French botanist
- Valentine Allorge (1888–1977), Russian-French botanist, phycologist, and bryologist; wife of Pierre Allorge
