= Retzius =

Retzius is a surname. Notable people with the surname include:

- Anders Jahan Retzius (1742–1821), Swedish naturalist
- Anders Retzius (1796–1860), Swedish anatomist; son of Anders Jahan Retzius
- Gustaf Retzius (1842–1919), Swedish anatomist, liberal publicist; son of Anders Retzius

== See also ==
- Retropubic space, also known as "Retzius' space"
- Striae of Retzius, named after Anders Retzius
- Retzia, genus of plant in the family Stilbaceae; named after Anders Jahan Retius
