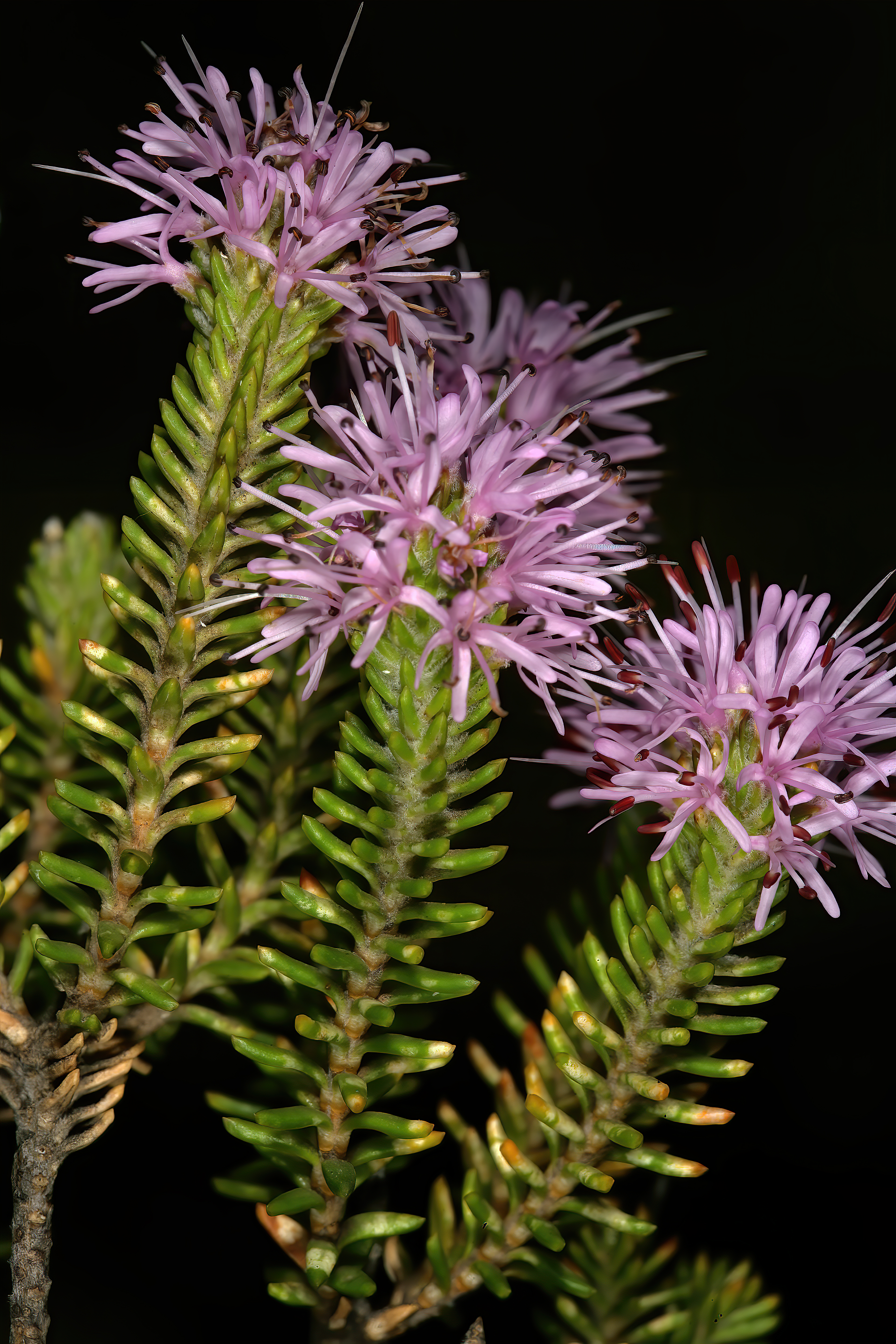
- Stilbe ericoides

Scientific classification
- Kingdom: Plantae
- Clade: Tracheophytes
- Clade: Angiosperms
- Clade: Eudicots
- Clade: Asterids
- Order: Lamiales
- Family: Stilbaceae
- Genus: Stilbe; P.J.Bergius

Type species
- Stilbe vestita P.J.Bergius

Synonyms
- Luehea F.W.Schmidt 1801, illegitimate name, not Willd. 1801 (Malvaceae); Eurylobium Hochst.; Xeroplana Briq.

= Stilbe (plant) =

Genus of plants

The plant genus Stilbe was described in 1767, originally as being in the Verbenaceae, but the genus now is placed in the family Stilbaceae. The entire genus is endemic to the Cape Province region of South Africa.

== Description and distribution ==
All the species are ericoid shrublets, endemic to fynbos areas. Their leaves are crowded into whorls and may be erect or reflexed. Their margins are revolute. The flowers are bisexual and set in the axils of bracts, with two narrow bracteoles. They are borne in short, dense terminal spikes. The calyx may be tubular or divided. The corolla is funnel-shaped with lobes about as long as the tube, often with a ring of white hairs in the throat, but hairless outside. There are four stamens inserted in the corolla-mouth. The ovary is entire, with two loculi, though they are not always well separated. There is a single, erect ovule in each loculus; the style is terete and the stigma simple, though sometimes slightly bifid at the tip. The fruit is oblong, enclosed in the calyx. Corresponding to the structure of the ovary, the fruit is generally two-lobed and two-locular, but sometimes by abortion, there may be only one locule and one seed. The seed is indehiscent and its testa is reticulated.

There are about half a dozen species of Stilbe and each occurs in limited areas in the fynbos extending from about Clanwilliam to Riversdale. They are elegant, sclerophyllous plants, with usually more than one stem and decorative flowering spikes, but they are not showy. Accordingly, they are of so little horticultural interest that they are not mentioned in the remarkably compendious Royal Horticultural Dictionary of Gardening

Species

1. Stilbe albiflora
2. Stilbe ericoides
3. Stilbe gymnopharyngia
4. Stilbe overbergensis
5. Stilbe rupestris
6. Stilbe serrulata
7. Stilbe vestita

formerly included

now in Campylostachys Kogelbergia

- Stilbe cernua - Campylostachys cernua
- Stilbe chorisepala - Kogelbergia verticillata
- Stilbe mucronata - Kogelbergia verticillata
- Stilbe mucronata var. cuspidata - Kogelbergia verticillata
- Stilbe phylicoides - Kogelbergia phylicoides
- Stilbe procumbens - Cephalanthus procumbens
- Stilbe verticillata - Kogelbergia verticillata
- Stilbe verticillata var. cuspidata - Kogelbergia verticillata
