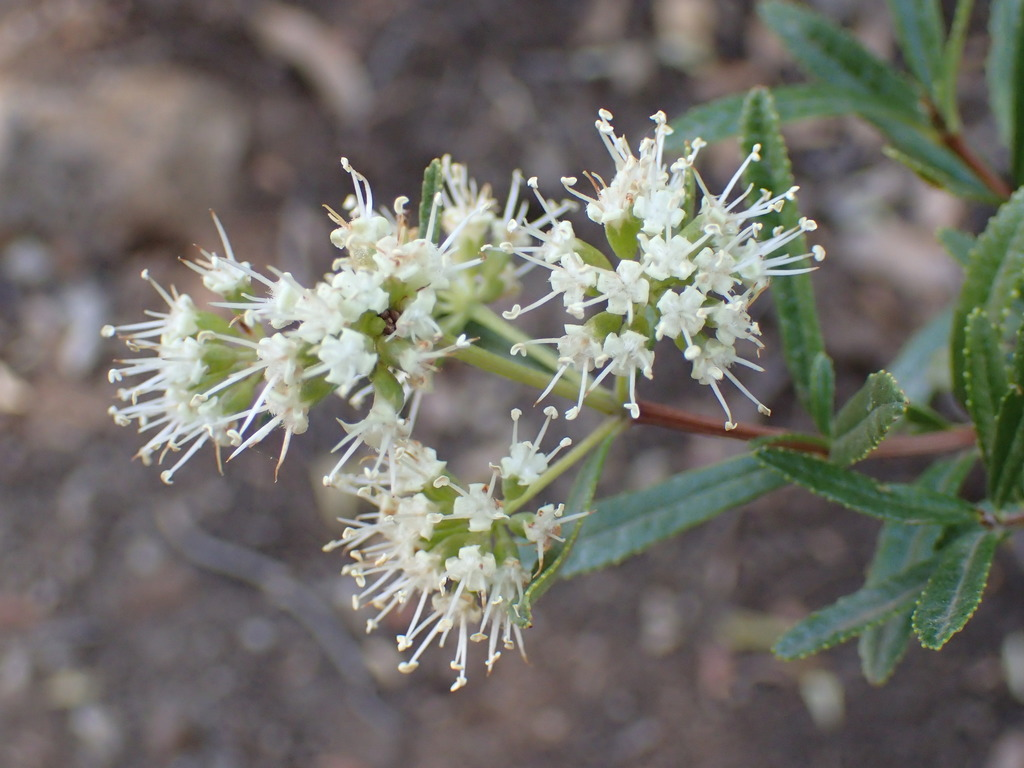

Scientific classification
- Kingdom: Plantae
- Clade: Embryophytes
- Clade: Tracheophytes
- Clade: Spermatophytes
- Clade: Angiosperms
- Clade: Eudicots
- Clade: Asterids
- Order: Lamiales
- Family: Stilbaceae
- Genus: Nuxia
- Species: N. gracilis

Binomial name
- Nuxia gracilis Engl.

Synonyms
- Lachnopylis gracilis (Engl.) C.A.Sm.

= Nuxia gracilis =

Species of flowering plant

Nuxia gracilis, commonly known as sticky elder or sticky nuxia, is a species of flowering plant in the family Stilbaceae. It is a shrub with white flowers, and capsule fruits. The species is native to South Africa, and was described in 1888.

== Taxonomy ==
The species was described by Adolf Engler in 1888.

== Distribution ==
The species is native to the seasonally dry tropical biome of South Africa. It is present in Limpopo, Mpumalanga, the Northern Cape, and the North West. The species is found at elevations of 915–1,770 metres (3,002–5,807 ft).

Nuxia gracilis grows in dry river beds, and at the base of limestone escarpments.

== Description ==
Nuxia gracilis is a perennial shrub that grows 1.2–4 metres (3.9–13.1 ft) high. The leaves are linear-oblanceolate, 15–45 millimetres (0.59–1.77 in) long, 2–8 millimetres (0.079–0.315 in) wide, and usually grow in groups of three. The leaf margins are finely serrated.

The flowers are white, arranged in clusters of eight or more, and grow on 2–5 millimetres (0.079–0.197 in) long stems. The calyx is light brown or green. The corolla is white, and forms a tube enclosed in the calyx. The corolla has lobes, which are broadly oblong, around 2.5 millimetres (0.098 in), and around 1.75 millimetres (0.069 in) wide. The inflorescences are similar to those of Nuxia glomerulata.

The fruits are dehiscent, densely hairy capsules.

== Names ==
In English, Nuxia gracilis is commonly known as sticky elder, sticky nuxia, or limestone-elder. In Afrikaans, the species is known as taaivlier or kalkvlier.
