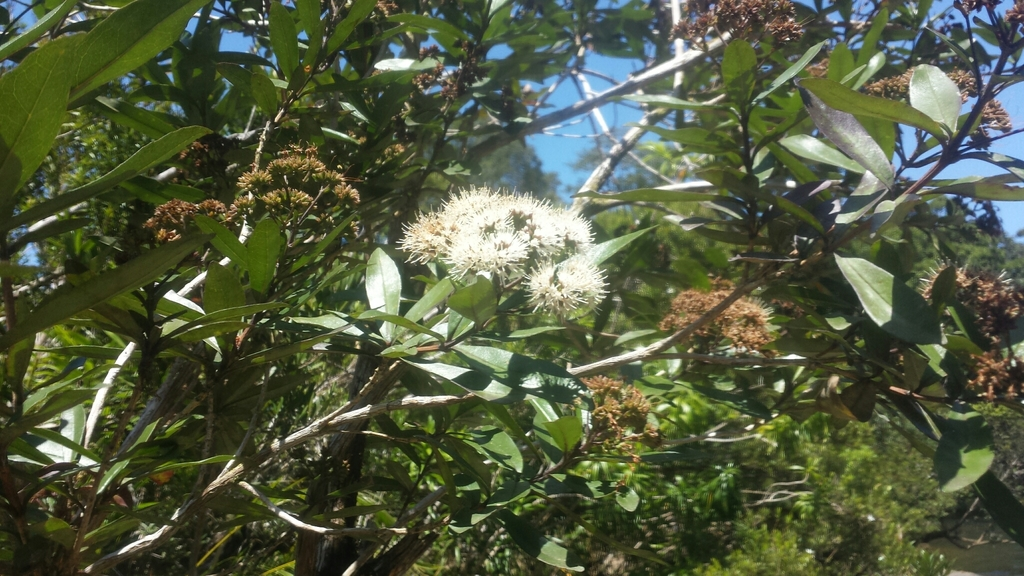

Conservation status
- Least Concern (IUCN 3.1)

Scientific classification
- Kingdom: Plantae
- Clade: Embryophytes
- Clade: Tracheophytes
- Clade: Spermatophytes
- Clade: Angiosperms
- Clade: Eudicots
- Clade: Asterids
- Order: Lamiales
- Family: Stilbaceae
- Genus: Nuxia
- Species: N. involucrata

Binomial name
- Nuxia involucrata Aug.DC.

Synonyms
- Nuxia involucrata var. typica Jovet; Nuxia chapelieri Jovet; Nuxia involucrata f. brevibracteata Jovet; Nuxia involucrata f. grandiflora Jovet

= Nuxia involucrata =

Species of flowering plant

Nuxia involucrata is a species of flowering plant in the family Stilbaceae. It is a shrub or tree endemic to Madagascar. The species was described in 1901, and is listed as of Least Concern by the IUCN.

== Taxonomy ==
Nuxia involucrata was described by Richard Émile Augustin de Candolle in 1901.

== Distribution ==
Nuxia involucrata is native to the seasonally dry tropical biome of northern and eastern Madagascar. The species grows in humid and sub-humid forests, and rocky areas near streams.

The species is widespread, and is found in around twenty-one areas. The species' extent of occurrence is around 208,686 square kilometres (80,574 sq mi), and it grows at elevations of 2–2,000 metres (6.6–6,561.7 ft).

== Description ==
Nuxia involucrata is a shrub or tree. It grows up to 6 metres (20 ft) high. The species fruits and flowers from June to January.

== Conservation ==
In 2020, the IUCN assessed Nuxia involucrata as of Least Concern, although the population is decreasing. There are around sixty subpopulations. The species is threatened by agriculture, mining, and logging.

Nuxia involucrata is known from protected areas, including Andohahela National Park, Andringitra National Park, Loky-Manambato, Manongarivo Special Reserve, Masoala National Park, Montagne d'Ambre National Park, Tsaratanana Reserve, and Zahamena National Park.

== Nomenclature ==
In Malagasy, Nuxia involucrata is known as Vandanirandrano or Valanirana.
