= Campylostachys =

Scientific classification
- Kingdom: Plantae
- Clade: Tracheophytes
- Clade: Angiosperms
- Clade: Eudicots
- Clade: Asterids
- Order: Lamiales
- Family: Stilbaceae
- Genus: Campylostachys; Kunth 1832 not E.Mey. 1843
- Species: C. cernua

Binomial name
- Campylostachys cernua (L.f.) Kunth

Synonyms
- Campilostachis A.Juss.; Stilbe cernua L.f.

Genus of flowering plants

Campylostachys is a genus of flowering plants in the family Stilbaceae described as a genus in 1832.

There is only one known species, Campylostachys cernua, endemic to the Cape Province region of South Africa.

formerly included

now in Euthystachys Kogelbergia

- Campylostachys abbreviata E.Mey 1838 not E.Mey. 1843, syn of Euthystachys abbreviata (E.Mey.) A.DC.
- Campylostachys phylicoides Sond. syn of Kogelbergia phylicoides (A.DC.) Rourke

names in Cyperaceae

In 1843, Meyer used the same name to refer to some plants in the Cyperaceae, thus creating an illegitimate homonym. Meyer's genus name and the species name he created in the genus are invalid as well as illegitimate, as they were published without descriptions.

- Campylostachys E.Mey. 1843 syn of Fimbristylis Vahl 1805
- Campylostachys abbreviata E.Mey. 1843 not E.Mey. 1838, syn of Fimbristylis ferruginea (L.) Vahl
