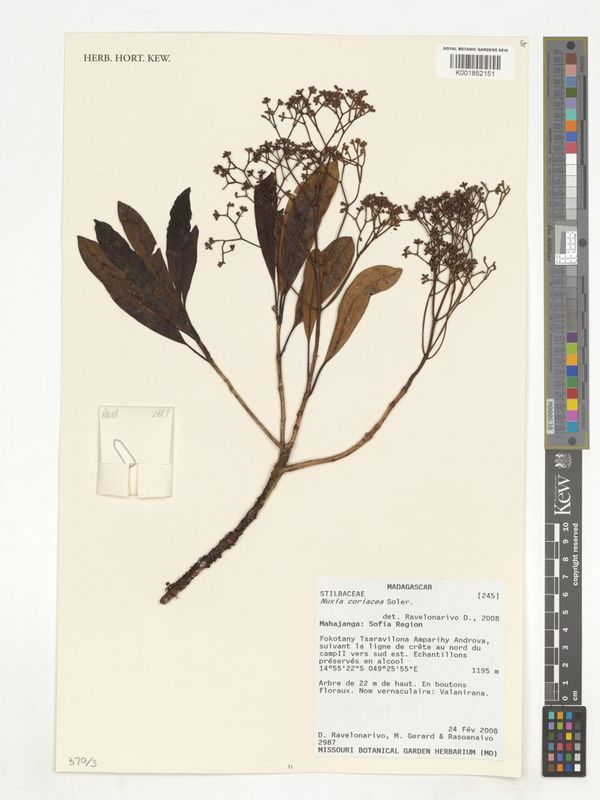

Conservation status
- Near Threatened (IUCN 3.1)

Scientific classification
- Kingdom: Plantae
- Clade: Embryophytes
- Clade: Tracheophytes
- Clade: Spermatophytes
- Clade: Angiosperms
- Clade: Eudicots
- Clade: Asterids
- Order: Lamiales
- Family: Stilbaceae
- Genus: Nuxia
- Species: N. coriacea

Binomial name
- Nuxia coriacea Soler.

Synonyms
- Nuxia subcoriacea Jovet

= Nuxia coriacea =

Species of flowering plant

Nuxia coriacea is a species of flowering plant in the family Stilbaceae. It is a shrub or tree native to Madagascar. The species was described in 1893, and is listed as Near Threatened by the IUCN.

== Taxonomy ==
The species was described by Hans Solereder in 1893.

== Distribution ==
Nuxia coriacea is native to the seasonally dry tropical biome of Madagascar. It is native to eastern and northern Madagascar, and is present at elevations of 300–1,300 metres (980–4,270 ft). The species' extent of occurrence is around 103,015 square kilometres (39,774 sq mi). There are twenty-one known sub-populations.

Nuxia coriacea grows in humid, subhumid, and disturbed forests.

== Description ==
Nuxia coriacea is a shrub or tree. It grows up to 22 metres (72 ft) high, and flowers and fruits in March and December.

== Conservation ==
In 2020, the IUCN assessed Nuxia coriacea as Near Threatened. Logging is the main threat to the species, though it is also affected by mining and grazing.

The species is present in the protected areas of Analamazaotra National Park, the Anjanaharibe-Sud Special Reserve, Anjozorobe Angavo, the Betampona Reserve, Makira Natural Park, Montagne d'Ambre National Park, and Ranomafana National Park.

== Names ==
In the Malagasy language, Nuxia coriacea is known as Lambinana.
