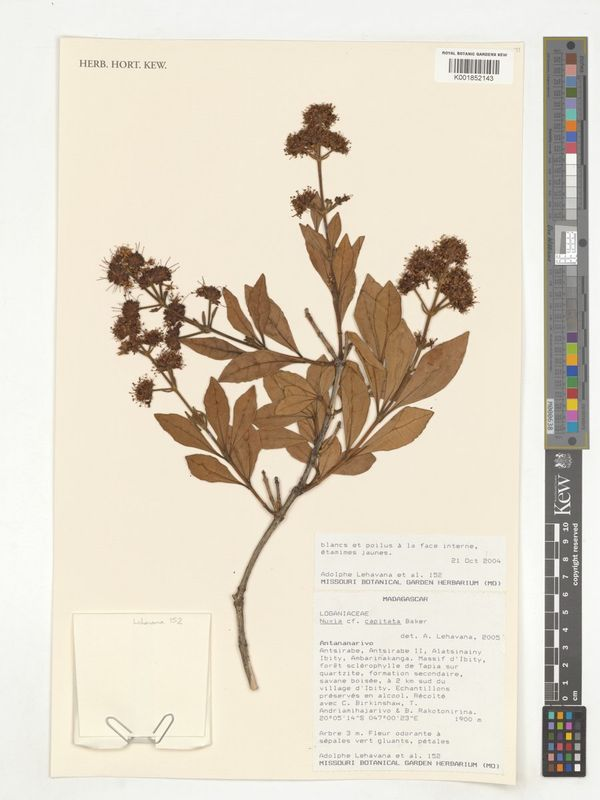

Conservation status
- Least Concern (IUCN 3.1)

Scientific classification
- Kingdom: Plantae
- Clade: Embryophytes
- Clade: Tracheophytes
- Clade: Spermatophytes
- Clade: Angiosperms
- Clade: Eudicots
- Clade: Asterids
- Order: Lamiales
- Family: Stilbaceae
- Genus: Nuxia
- Species: N. capitata

Binomial name
- Nuxia capitata Baker

= Nuxia capitata =

Species of flowering plant

Nuxia capitata is a species of flowering plant in the family Stilbaceae. It is a shrub or tree with whitish flowers, and is endemic to Madagascar. The species was described in 1882, and is listed as of Least Concern by the IUCN.

== Taxonomy ==
The species was described by John Gilbert Baker in 1882.

== Distribution ==
Nuxia capitata is native to the seasonally dry tropical biome of central and south-central Madagascar. It is endemic to the country.

The species is widespread in east, central, and northern Madagascar, and is present in the regions of Diana, Analamanga, Vakinankaratra, Vatovavy, Fitovinany, and Alaotra-Mangoro. It has an extent of occurrence of 76,016 square kilometres (29,350 sq mi). Nuxia capitata grows in subhumid forests, at elevations of 800–1,600 metres (2,600–5,200 ft).

== Description ==
Nuxia capitata is a shrub or tree. It grows up to 14 metres (46 ft) high. The branches are slender and cylindrical.

The leaves are arranged oppositely. The leaf stems are 0.5–0.75 inches (1.3–1.9 cm) long. The leaves are subleathery, 2–3 inches (5.1–7.6 cm) long, and oblong to oblanceolate-oblong.

The calyx is oblong, leathery, and lacks a stem. The corolla is whitish, and forms a tube which is divided into four segments. The flowers have four stamens.

== Conservation ==
In 2020, the IUCN assessed Nuxia capitata as of Least Concern. There are twenty-three known subpopulations. The species is at risk from habitat loss, caused by logging, fires, and agriculture.

The species is present in protected areas, including Ambohitantely Special Reserve, Analamazaotra National Park, the Anjozorobe-Angavo Reserve, the Manongarivo Special Reserve, and Ranomafana National Park.

== Names ==
In the Malagasy language, Nuxia capitata is known as Valanirana Arbre or Lambinana.
