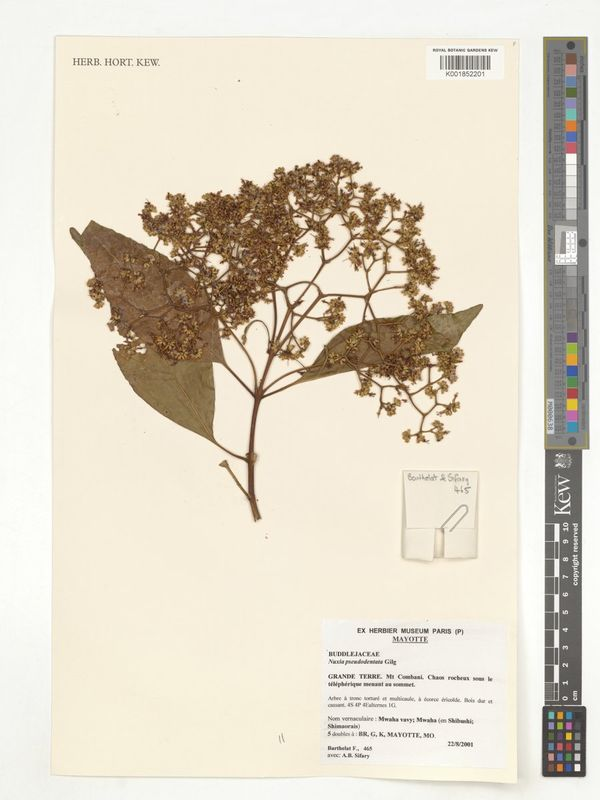

Scientific classification
- Kingdom: Plantae
- Clade: Embryophytes
- Clade: Tracheophytes
- Clade: Spermatophytes
- Clade: Angiosperms
- Clade: Eudicots
- Clade: Asterids
- Order: Lamiales
- Family: Stilbaceae
- Genus: Nuxia
- Species: N. pseudodentata

Binomial name
- Nuxia pseudodentata Gilg

Synonyms
- Nuxia neurophylla Gilg

= Nuxia pseudodentata =

Species of flowering plant

Nuxia pseudodentata is a species of flowering plant in the family Stilbaceae. It is a tree native to the Comoros, that was described in 1895. The wood is used for fuel.

== Taxonomy ==
The species was described in 1895, by Ernest Friedrich Gilg.

== Distribution ==
Nuxia pseudodentata is native to the seasonally dry tropical biome of the Comoros.

== Description ==
Nuxia pseudodentata is a shrub or tree.

== Uses ==
Nuxia pseudodentata wood is a popular source of fuel on Grande Comore.
