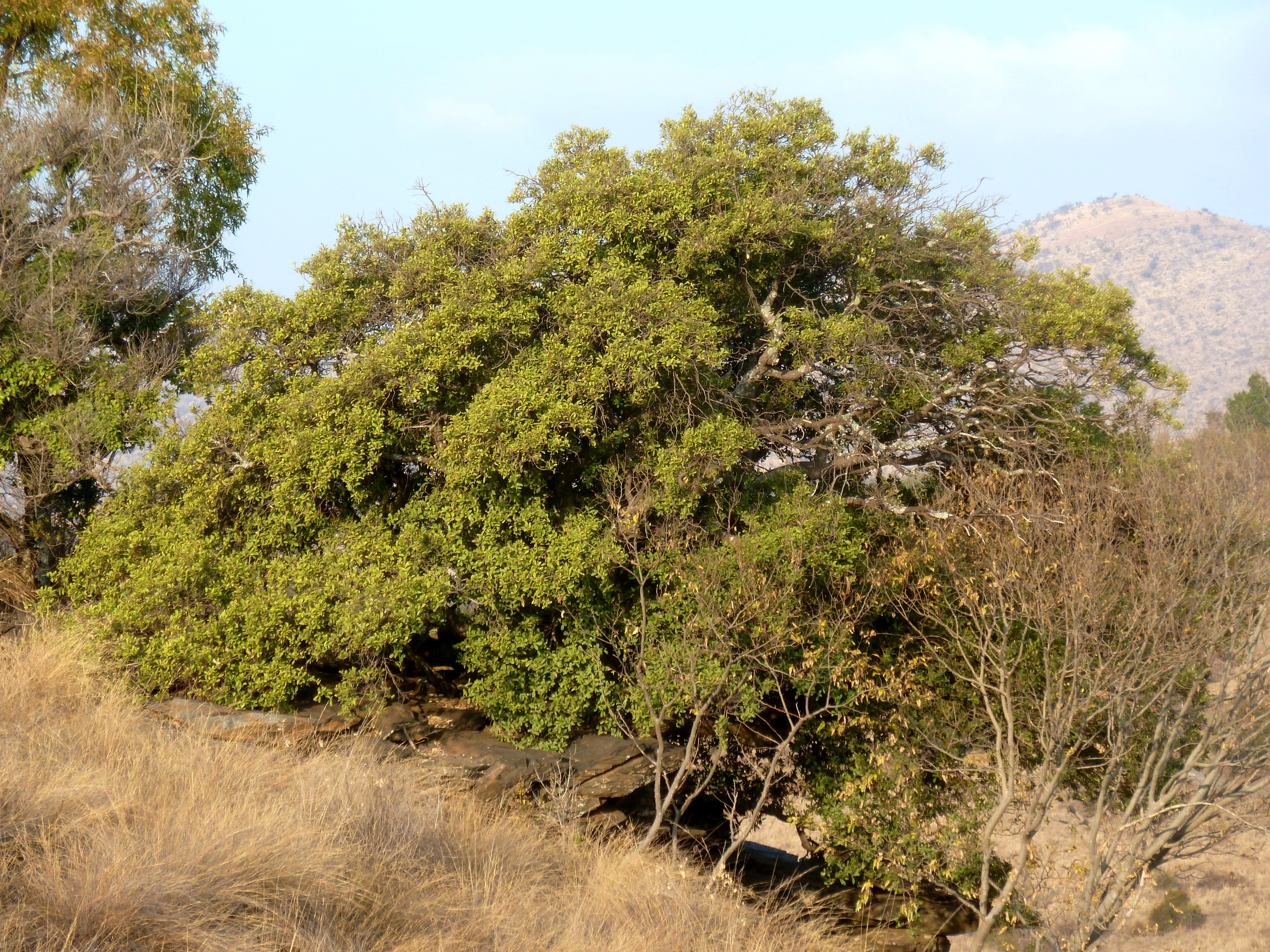
- Habit on a cliff ledge, Gauteng
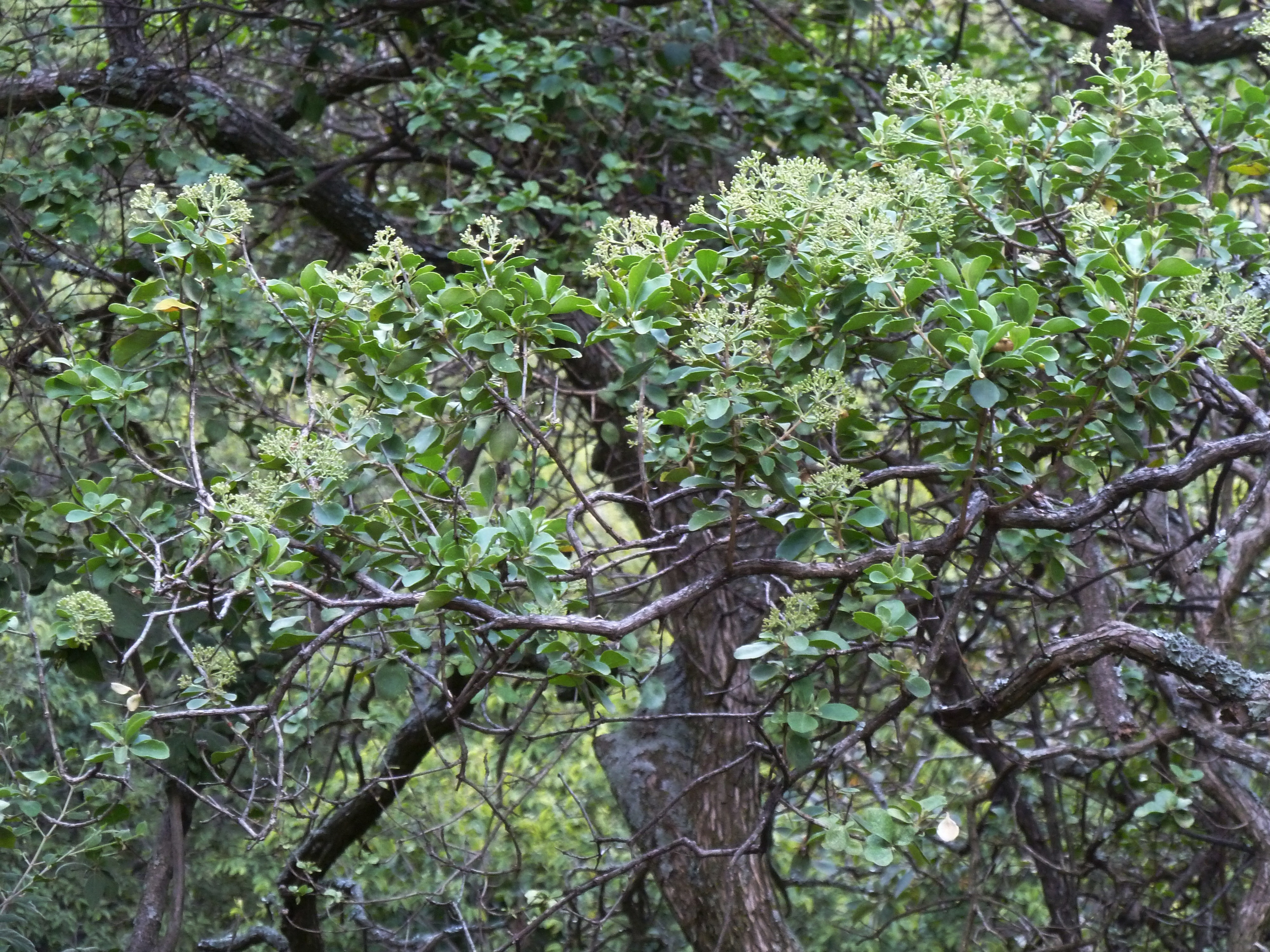
- Foliage and inflorescences

Conservation status
- Least Concern (IUCN 3.1)

Scientific classification
- Kingdom: Plantae
- Clade: Embryophytes
- Clade: Tracheophytes
- Clade: Spermatophytes
- Clade: Angiosperms
- Clade: Eudicots
- Clade: Asterids
- Order: Lamiales
- Family: Stilbaceae
- Genus: Nuxia
- Species: N. congesta

Binomial name
- Nuxia congesta R.Br. ex Fresen.

Synonyms
- Over 40, including: Nuxia sambesina Gilg; Nuxia viscosa Gibbs

= Nuxia congesta =

Brittle-wood

Species of tree

Nuxia congesta, commonly known as brittle-wood, is a species of tree in the Stilbaceae family, with an extensive range in the Afrotropics. The species is named congesta for its dense inflorescences.

== Range ==
The species is native to Eswatini, South Africa, Zimbabwe, Mozambique and Zimbabwe, northwards to tropical Africa, Ethiopia and southern Arabia. It is also found on the islands in the Gulf of Guinea.

== Habitat ==
It is a component of woodland, bushveld or grassland, and occurs along forest verges, but has a predisposition for rocky terrain and cliff ledges.

== Similar species ==
Nuxia glomerulata has a restricted range between Pretoria and Zeerust, South Africa, and differs by its more elliptic, leathery and glabrous leaves. Nuxia floribunda carries the leaves on long and slender petioles, and has larger and less dense inflorescences.
