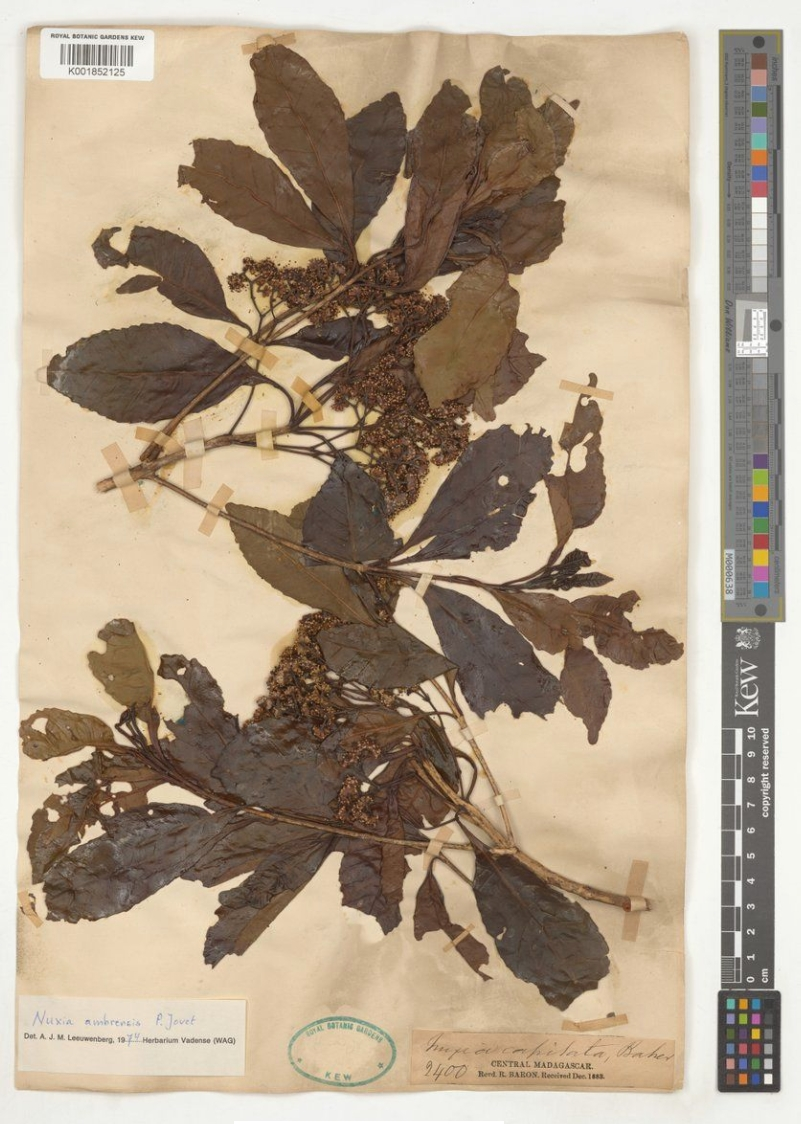

Conservation status
- Endangered (IUCN 3.1)

Scientific classification
- Kingdom: Plantae
- Clade: Embryophytes
- Clade: Tracheophytes
- Clade: Spermatophytes
- Clade: Angiosperms
- Clade: Eudicots
- Clade: Asterids
- Order: Lamiales
- Family: Stilbaceae
- Genus: Nuxia
- Species: N. ambrensis

Binomial name
- Nuxia ambrensis Jovet

= Nuxia ambrensis =

Species of flowering plant

Nuxia ambrensis is a species of flowering plant in the family Stilbaceae. It is a tree native to northern Madagascar. The IUCN lists the species as Endangered.

== Taxonomy ==
The species was described by Paul Albert Jovet in 1947.

== Distribution ==
Nuxia ambrensis is native to the wet tropical biome of northern Madagascar. It is found in three locations, in the regions of Sava and Diana. Its extent of occurrence is around 991 square kilometres (383 sq mi).

The species is found at elevations of 500–1,100 metres (1,600–3,600 ft).

== Description ==
Nuxia ambrensis is a tree that grows up to 25 metres (82 ft) high. It flowers in February.

== Conservation ==
In 2020, the IUCN assessed Nuxia ambrensis as Endangered. It is threatened by habitat loss, which may be caused by logging, agriculture, and fire. The species is found in Marojejy National Park, and Montagne d'Ambre National Park.

== Nomenclature ==
In Malagasy, Nuxia ambrensis is known as Pilo.
