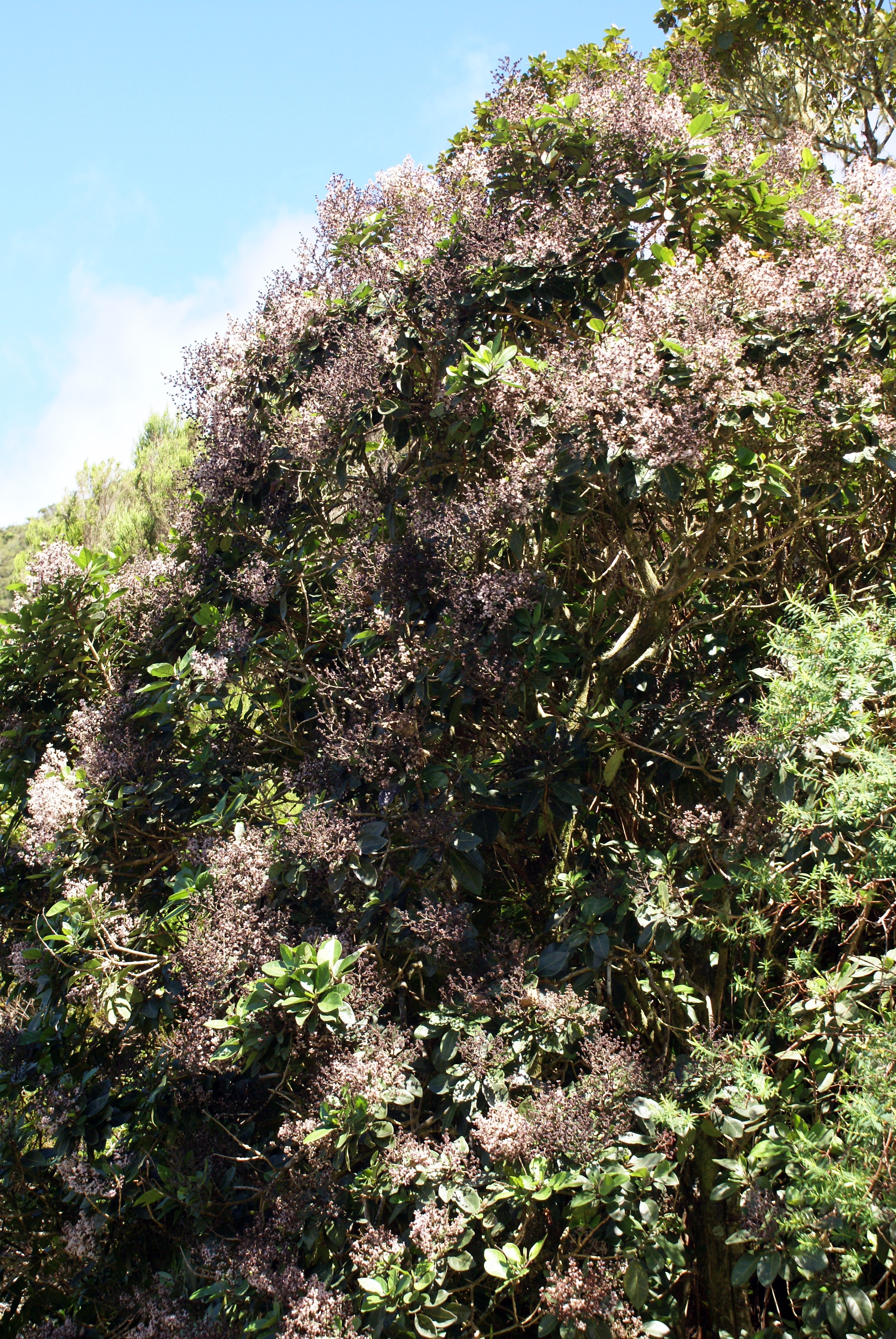

Scientific classification
- Kingdom: Plantae
- Clade: Embryophytes
- Clade: Tracheophytes
- Clade: Spermatophytes
- Clade: Angiosperms
- Clade: Eudicots
- Clade: Asterids
- Order: Lamiales
- Family: Stilbaceae
- Genus: Nuxia
- Species: N. verticillata

Binomial name
- Nuxia verticillata Lam.

Synonyms
- Aegiphila nuxia Willd.

= Nuxia verticillata =

Species of flowering plant

Nuxia verticillata is a species of flowering plant in the family Stilbaceae. It is a tree with elliptical to oblong-elliptical leaves, and pyramidal inflorescences.

The species is native to the Mascarene Islands. It was described in 1792. The wood is used in construction.

== Taxonomy ==
The species was first described by Jean-Baptiste Lamarck, in the Tableau encyclopédique et méthodique. The description was published in 1792.

== Distribution ==
Nuxia verticillata is native to the wet tropical biome of the Mascarene Islands. It is present in Mauritius and Réunion. In Mauritius, the species is common in woodlands.

== Description ==
Nuxia verticillata is a tree. It has elliptical to oblong-elliptical leaves, which are up to 11 centimetres (4.3 in) long, and 7 centimetres (2.8 in) wide. The leaves have smooth margins.

The inflorescences are up to 20 centimetres (7.9 in) long, and 28 centimetres (11 in) wide, pyramidal in shape, and have angled branches. The calyx is around 2 millimetres (0.079 in) long, and the corolla is around twice as long.

== Uses ==
In Réunion, the wood is used in construction, including to create rafters in roofs.

== Nomenclature ==
In French, the species is known as bois maigre.
