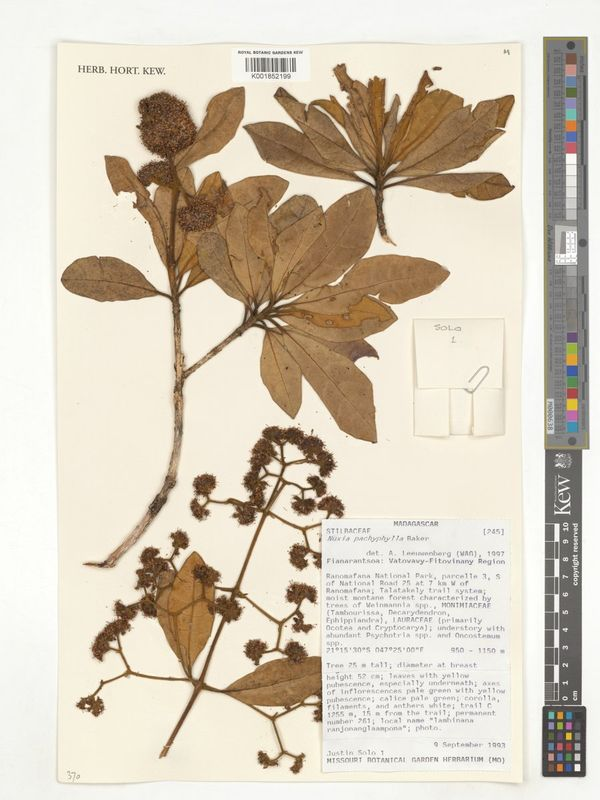

Conservation status
- Least Concern (IUCN 3.1)

Scientific classification
- Kingdom: Plantae
- Clade: Tracheophytes
- Clade: Angiosperms
- Clade: Eudicots
- Clade: Asterids
- Order: Lamiales
- Family: Stilbaceae
- Genus: Nuxia
- Species: N. pachyphylla

Binomial name
- Nuxia pachyphylla Baker

Synonyms
- Lachnopylis pachyphylla (Baker) C.A.Sm.; Lachnopylis scytophylla C.A.Sm.; Nuxia decaryi Jovet; Nuxia polycephala Boivin ex Jovet

= Nuxia pachyphylla =

Species of flowering plant

Nuxia pachyphylla is a species of flowering plant in the family Stilbaceae. It is a shrub or tree endemic to Madagascar. The species was described in 1887, and is listed as Least Concern by the IUCN.

== Taxonomy ==
The species was described by John Gilbert Baker in 1887.

== Distribution ==
Nuxia pachyphylla is endemic to the seasonally dry tropical biome of Madagascar. It is widespread in the east, central, and north of Madagascar, and has an estimated extent of occurrence of 328,150 square kilometres (126,700 sq mi). The species is present in the regions of Diana, Analamanga, Bongolava, Amoron'i Mania, Atsimo-Atsinanana, Ihorombe, Alaotra-Mangoro, and Analanjirofo.

Nuxia pachyphylla grows at elevations of 10–2,000 metres (33–6,562 ft), in humid, subhumid, and montane forests.

== Description ==
Nuxia pachyphylla is a shrub or tree up to 20 metres (66 ft) tall. It has woody branchlets. The leaves are arranged oppositely or in groups of three. The leaves are 2–4 inches (5.1–10.2 cm) long, and 1–2 inches (2.5–5.1 cm) wide. The calyx is brown to black, and leathery.

The plant flowers and fruits from June to December.

== Conservation ==
In 2020, the IUCN assessed Nuxia pachyphylla as of Least Concern. The species faces habitat loss from logging, grazing, and fires.

Nuxia pachyphylla is present in protected areas, including Analamazaotra National Park, Midongy du sud National Park, the Fandriana Marolambo forest corridor, Isalo National Park, Loky-Manambato, Montagne d'Ambre National Park, Nosy Mangabe, Ranomafana National Park, and Tsaratanana Reserve.

== Nomenclature ==
In the Malagasy language, Nuxia pachyphylla is known as Valanirana.
