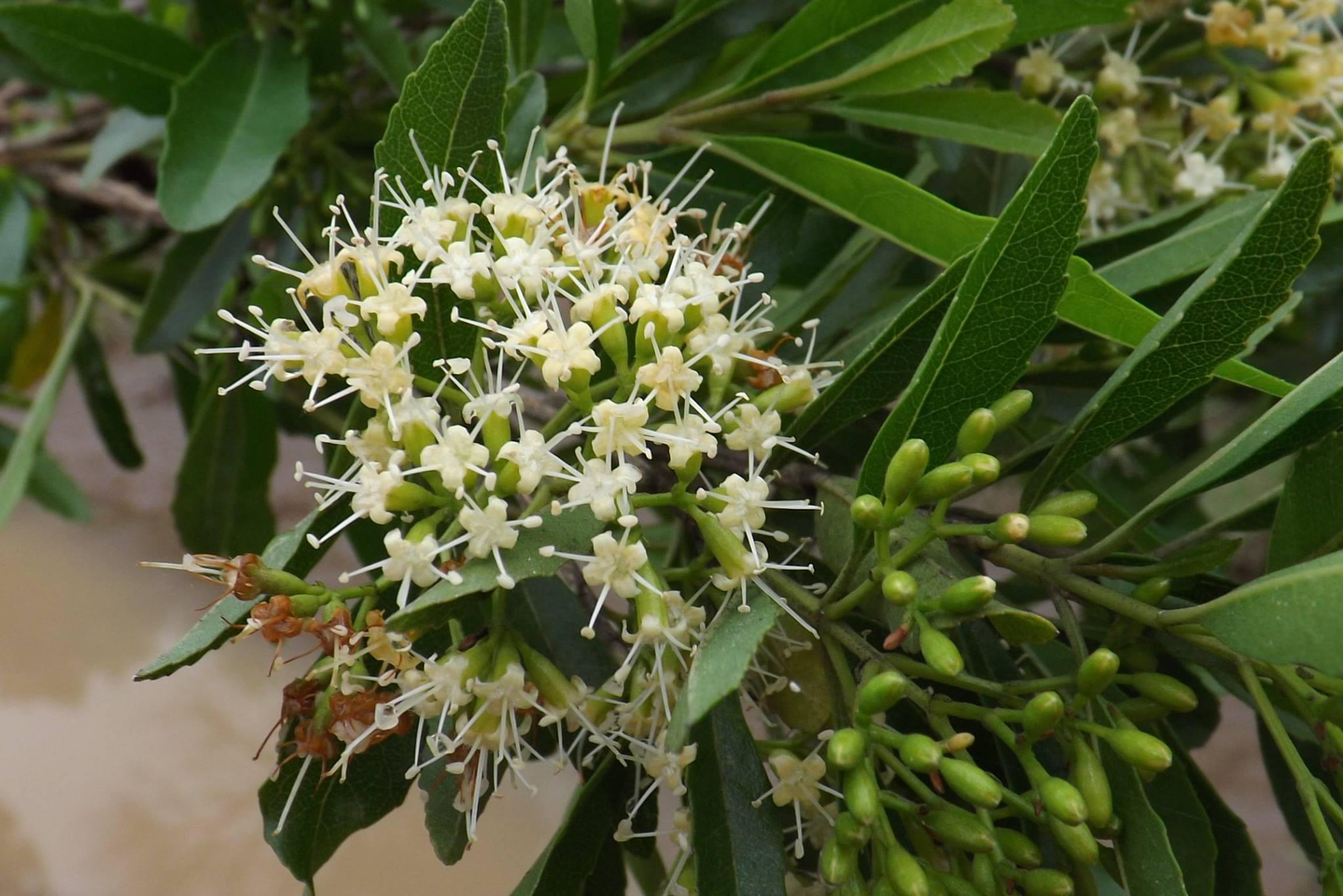

Conservation status
- Least Concern (IUCN 3.1)

Scientific classification
- Kingdom: Plantae
- Clade: Embryophytes
- Clade: Tracheophytes
- Clade: Spermatophytes
- Clade: Angiosperms
- Clade: Eudicots
- Clade: Asterids
- Order: Lamiales
- Family: Stilbaceae
- Genus: Nuxia
- Species: N. oppositifolia

Binomial name
- Nuxia oppositifolia (Hochst.) Benth.

Synonyms
- Lachnopylis oppositifolia Hochst.; Nuxia autunesii Gilg; Nuxia capitata var. tomentella Hochr.; Nuxia dentata R.Br. ex Benth.; Nuxia dentata var. glutinosa Engl.; Nuxia schlechteri Gilg; Nuxia tomentella (Hochr.) Jovet; Nuxia tomentella f. farinosa Jovet; Nuxia tomentella var. meridionalis Jovet; Nuxia tomentella f. microphylla Jovet; Nuxia tomentella f. subdentata Jovet; Nuxia tomentella var. typica Jovet

= Nuxia oppositifolia =

Species of flowering plant

Nuxia oppositifolia, commonly known as water elder or water nuxia, is a species of flowering plant in the family Stilbaceae. It is native to a wide area of Africa, and to the Arabian Peninsula.

Nuxia oppositifolia is a shrub or small tree, with reddish-brown bark, leathery or sub-leathery leaves, and whitish or lilac flowers. The International Union for the Conservation of Nature lists the species as of Least Concern.

== Taxonomy ==
The species was first described as Lachnopylis oppositifolia, by Christian Ferdinand Friedrich Hochstetter, in 1843. The species' current name was first published by George Bentham in 1846.

== Distribution ==
Nuxia oppositifolia is native to the seasonally dry tropical biome of Africa, Madagascar, and the south-west Arabian Peninsula. It is present in Angola, Djibouti, the Democratic Republic of the Congo, Eritrea, Eswatini, Ethiopia, Kenya, Malawi, Mozambique, Namibia, Saudi Arabia, Somalia, Sudan, South Sudan, Tanzania, Uganda, Yemen, Zambia, and Zimbabwe. Within South Africa, it is present in the provinces of KwaZulu-Natal, Limpopo, and Mpumalanga.

The species grows in sub-tropical forests, near streams and rivers, in gorges and valleys, and among rocks and reeds. Its estimated extent of occurrence is 12,093,063.67 square kilometres (4,669,157.99 sq mi). It grows at altitudes of 50–1,325 metres (164–4,347 ft).

== Description ==
Nuxia oppositifolia is a shrub or small tree that grows 1–15 metres (3.3–49.2 ft). It is often gnarled, and sometimes straggling. The trunk has reddish-brown bark, and is 10–60 centimetres (3.9–23.6 in) in diameter.

When dry, the leaves are leathery or subleathery. The leaves are narrowly elliptical. The leaves are 3–13 centimetres (1.2–5.1 in) long, and 0.4–3 centimetres (0.16–1.18 in) wide. The leaves are arranged oppositely, or sometimes alternately. The leaves have 2–12 millimetres (0.079–0.472 in) long stems.

The flowers are white, creamy, or lilac in colour, and slightly fragrant. They grow alone, or in groups of up to three. The inflorescence is 1.5–7 centimetres (0.59–2.76 in) long, and 2–8 centimetres (0.79–3.15 in) wide. The calyx is green, 4–5 millimetres (0.16–0.20 in) long, and has cleanly divided lobes.

The seeds are 0.5–0.8 millimetres (0.020–0.031 in) long, and 0.15–0.2 millimetres (0.0059–0.0079 in) wide.

== Names ==
In Afrikaans, the species is known as watervlier. In the Swazi language, the species is known as sikhweza. In the Sena language, the species is known as Nhantsonzue. In the Tsonga language, the species is known as muheravudzi, mswingiri, mpfimbamitlwa, or fimbamitchua. In the Venda language, the species is known as mulėamvuvhu or mulamvuvhu. In the Zulu language, the species is known as inkhweza.

== Conservation ==
In 2018, the IUCN assessed Nuxia oppositifolia as of Least Concern. The species has a wide distribution and a stable population. It faces no major threats.
