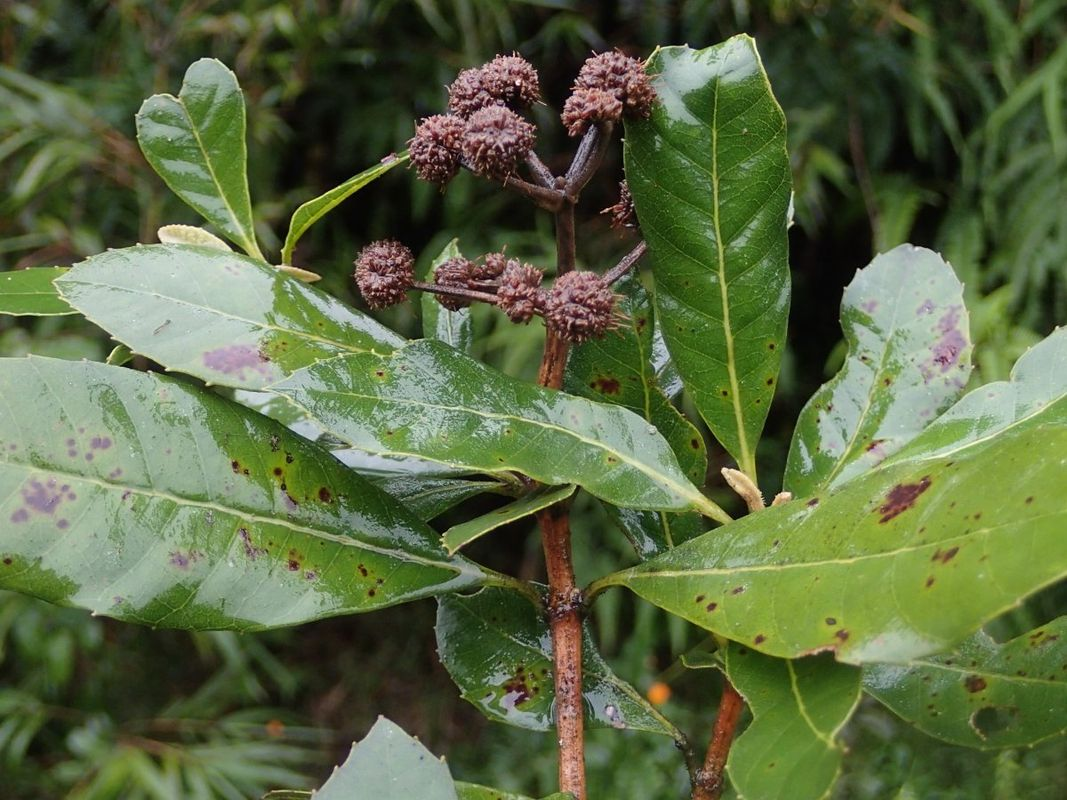

Conservation status
- Least Concern (IUCN 3.1)

Scientific classification
- Kingdom: Plantae
- Clade: Embryophytes
- Clade: Tracheophytes
- Clade: Spermatophytes
- Clade: Angiosperms
- Clade: Eudicots
- Clade: Asterids
- Order: Lamiales
- Family: Stilbaceae
- Genus: Nuxia
- Species: N. sphaerocephala

Binomial name
- Nuxia sphaerocephala Baker

Synonyms
- Buddleja sphaerocephala Baker; Lachnopylis sphaerocephala (Baker) C.A.Sm.; Lachnopylis terminalioides Baker) C.A.Sm.; Nuxia humbertii Jovet; Nuxia sambiranensis Jovet; Nuxia terminalioides Baker

= Nuxia sphaerocephala =

Species of flowering plant

Nuxia sphaerocephala is a species of flowering plant in the family Stilbaceae. It is a shrub or tree endemic to Madagascar. The species was described in 1885, and is listed as of Least Concern by the IUCN. The wood is used for construction.

== Taxonomy ==
The species was first described by John Gilbert Baker in 1885. Baker initially placed it in the genus Buddleja. In 1887, Baker transferred the species to Nuxia.

== Distribution ==
Nuxia sphaerocephala is endemic to the seasonally dry tropical biome of Madagascar. It is present in north, east-central, and eastern Madagascar, and distributed across the provinces of Antananarivo, Antsiranana, Fianarantsoa, and Toamasina. Its estimated extent of occurrence is 181,907 square kilometres (70,235 sq mi).

Nuxia sphaerocephala is present at elevations of 300–1,500 metres (980–4,920 ft). It grows in dry, humid, and subhumid forests.

== Description ==
Nuxia sphaerocephala is a shrub or tree. It grows 1.5–10 metres (4.9–32.8 ft) high. The corolla falls off by dehiscence.

== Conservation ==
In 2018, the IUCN assessed Nuxia sphaerocephala as of Least Concern. The species is threatened by deforestation, mining, and agriculture. It is present in the protected areas of Ambohitantely Special Reserve, Analamazaotra National Park, Manongarivo Special Reserve, and Tsaratanana Reserve.

== Uses ==
The wood is used for construction and firewood. The leaves are used as an aphrodisiac.

== Nomenclature ==
In the Malagasy language, Nuxia sphaerocephala is known as Valanirana.
