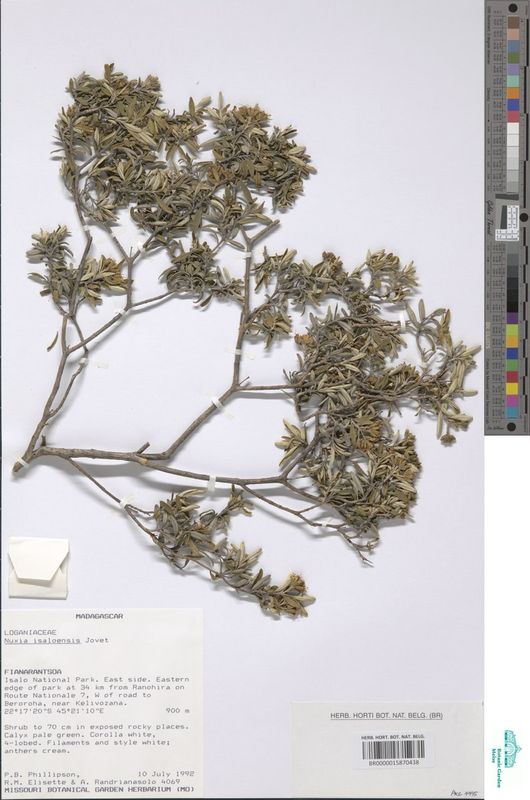

Scientific classification
- Kingdom: Plantae
- Clade: Embryophytes
- Clade: Tracheophytes
- Clade: Spermatophytes
- Clade: Angiosperms
- Clade: Eudicots
- Clade: Asterids
- Order: Lamiales
- Family: Stilbaceae
- Genus: Nuxia
- Species: N. isaloensis

Binomial name
- Nuxia isaloensis Jovet

= Nuxia isaloensis =

Species of flowering plant

Nuxia isaloensis is a species of flowering plant in the family Stilbaceae. It is a shrub endemic to Madagascar. The species was described in 1947.

== Taxonomy ==
The species was described by Paul Albert Jovet in 1947.

== Distribution ==
Nuxia isaloensis is native to the seasonally dry tropical biome of south-central Madagascar. It is endemic to Madagascar.

== Description ==
Nuxia isaloensis is a shrub.
