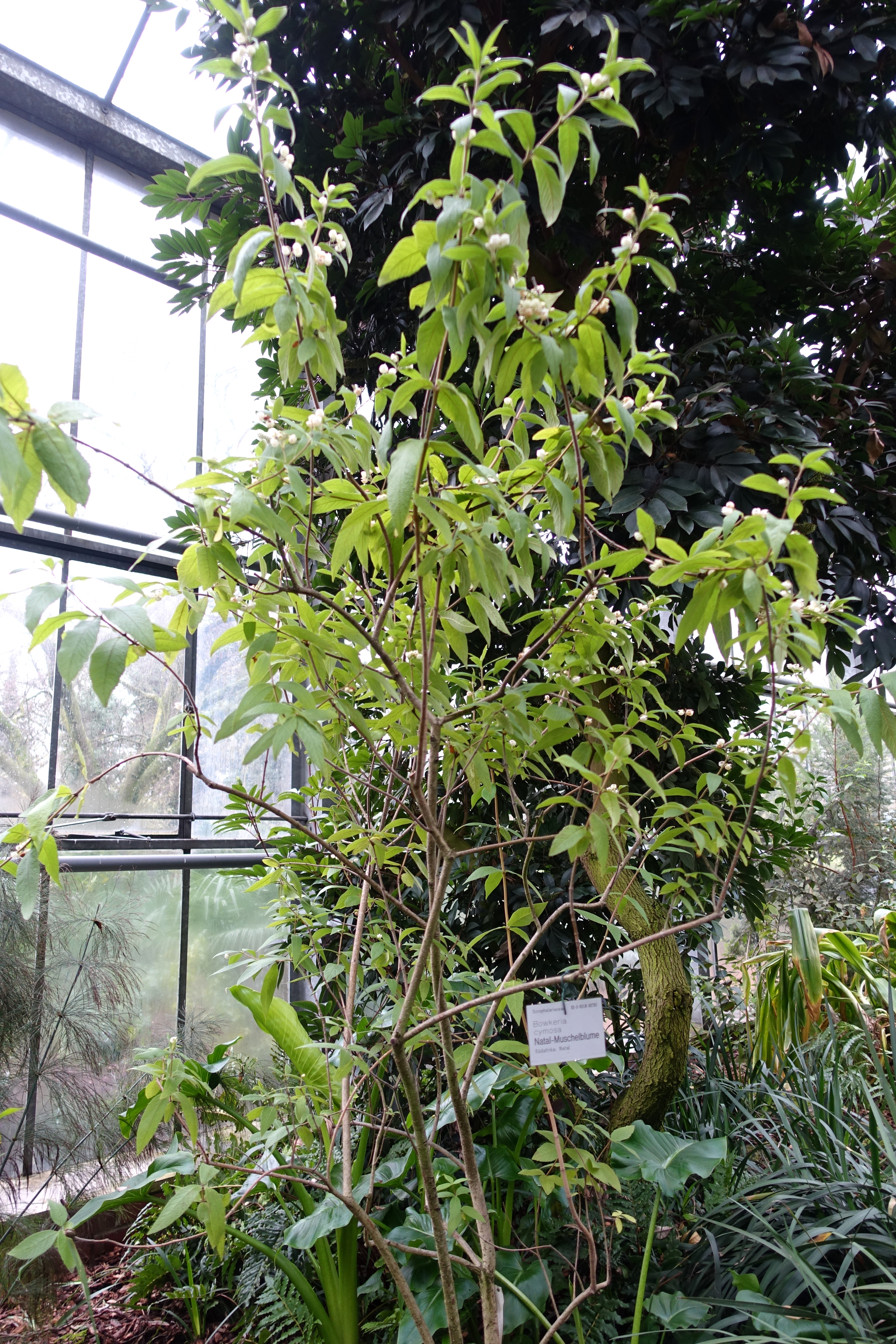

Scientific classification
- Kingdom: Plantae
- Clade: Embryophytes
- Clade: Tracheophytes
- Clade: Spermatophytes
- Clade: Angiosperms
- Clade: Eudicots
- Clade: Asterids
- Order: Lamiales
- Family: Stilbaceae
- Genus: Bowkeria
- Species: B. cymosa

Binomial name
- Bowkeria cymosa MacOwan

= Bowkeria cymosa =

Species of flowering plant

Bowkeria cymosa, the Transvaal shellflower bush, is a species of flowering plants in the family Stilbaceae. It is a leafy, bushy shrub, up to 8 feet in height, endemic to South Africa.
