= Wild elder =

Wild elder is a common name for several plants and may refer to:

- Plant species of the genus Sambucus
- Nuxia floribunda, a species of tree native to Africa
