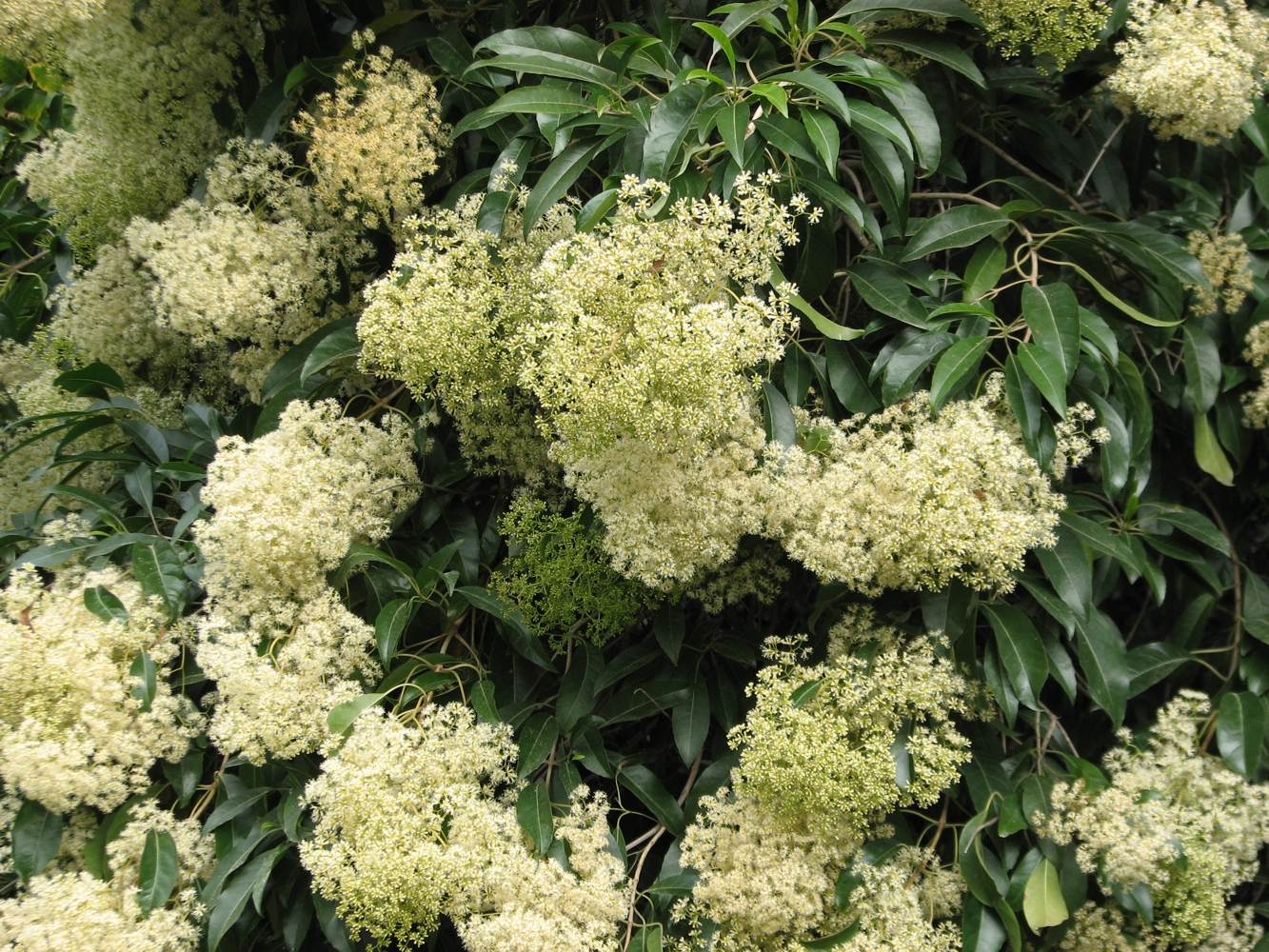
- Nuxia floribunda

Scientific classification
- Kingdom: Plantae
- Clade: Embryophytes
- Clade: Tracheophytes
- Clade: Spermatophytes
- Clade: Angiosperms
- Clade: Eudicots
- Clade: Asterids
- Order: Lamiales
- Family: Stilbaceae
- Genus: Nuxia; Comm. ex Lam. (1791)

Type species
- Nuxia verticillata Lam.

Synonyms
- Lachnopylis Hochst. (1843)

= Nuxia =

Genus of flowering plants

Nuxia is a genus of plants in the family Stilbaceae described as a genus in 1791. It was formerly placed in the Loganiaceae and Buddlejaceae families.

Nuxia is native to Africa, the Arabian Peninsula, and certain islands in the Indian Ocean.

== Species ==
The genus contains fifteen species.

- Nuxia allorgeorum Jovet - Madagascar
- Nuxia ambrensis Jovet - Madagascar
- Nuxia capitata Baker - Madagascar
- Nuxia congesta R.Br. ex Fresen. - Saudi Arabia, much of sub-Saharan Africa
- Nuxia coriacea Soler. - Madagascar
- Nuxia floribunda Benth. - E + S Africa from Uganda to Cape Prov
- Nuxia glomerulata (C.A.Sm.) Verd. - Gauteng, North West
- Nuxia gracilis Engl. - Limpopo, Mpumalanga, Northern Cape, North West
- Nuxia involucrata Aug.DC. - Madagascar
- Nuxia isaloensis Jovet - Madagascar
- Nuxia oppositifolia (Hochst.) Benth. - Yemen, Saudi Arabia, Madagascar, E + C + S Africa from Eritrea to KwaZulu-Natal
- Nuxia pachyphylla Baker - Madagascar
- Nuxia pseudodentata Gilg - Comoros
- Nuxia sphaerocephala Baker - Madagascar
- Nuxia verticillata Lam. - Mauritius, Réunion
