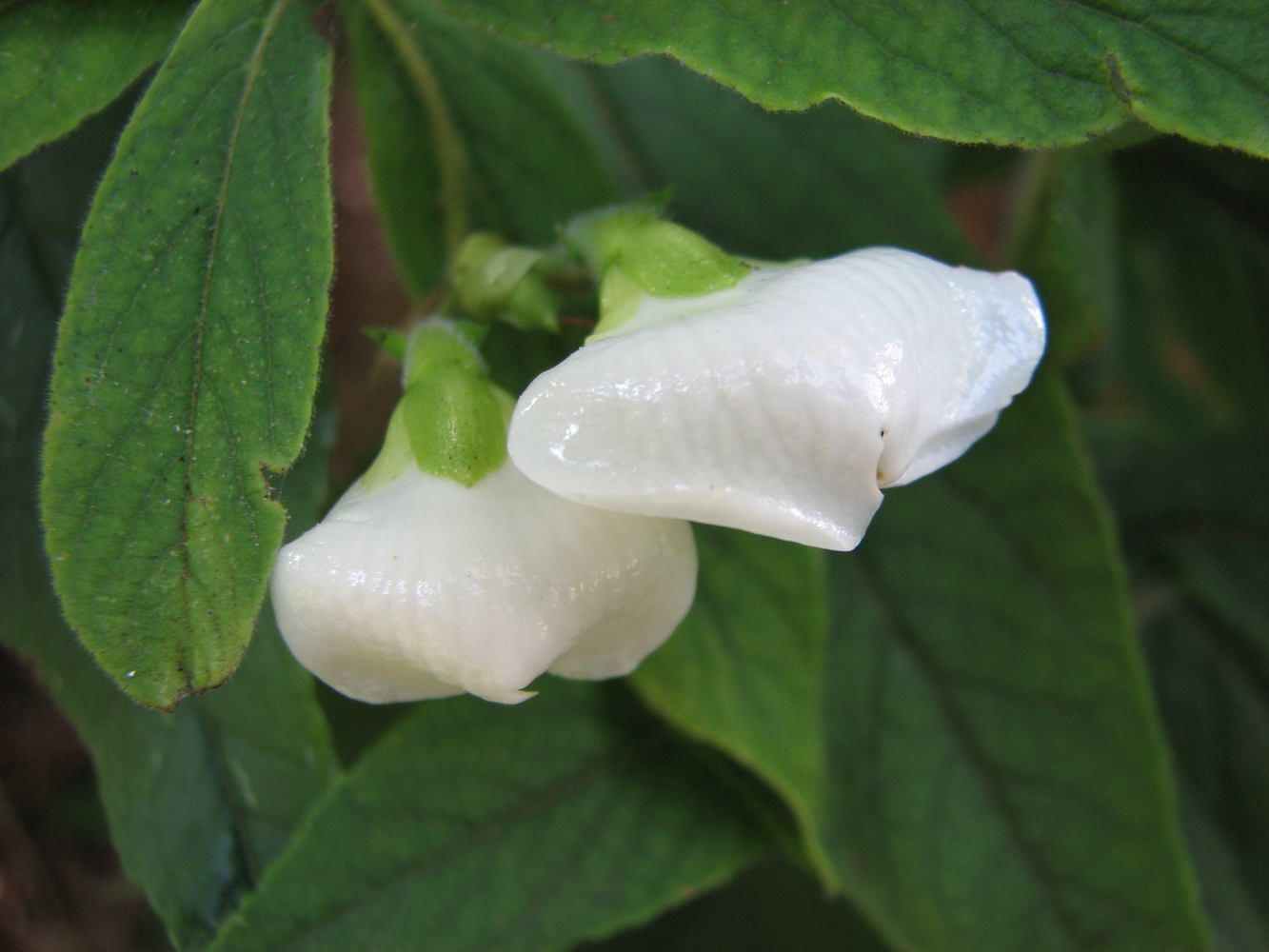
- Bowkeria verticillata

Scientific classification
- Kingdom: Plantae
- Clade: Tracheophytes
- Clade: Angiosperms
- Clade: Eudicots
- Clade: Asterids
- Order: Lamiales
- Family: Stilbaceae
- Genus: Bowkeria; Harv.

= Bowkeria =

Genus of flowering plants

Bowkeria is a genus of flowering plants in the family Stilbaceae described as a genus in 1859.

The genus is native to South Africa, Eswatini, and Lesotho.

== Species ==
Three species are accepted.

- Bowkeria citrina Thode
- Bowkeria cymosa MacOwan
- Bowkeria verticillata (Eckl. & Zeyh.) Schinz - Natal Shell-flower
