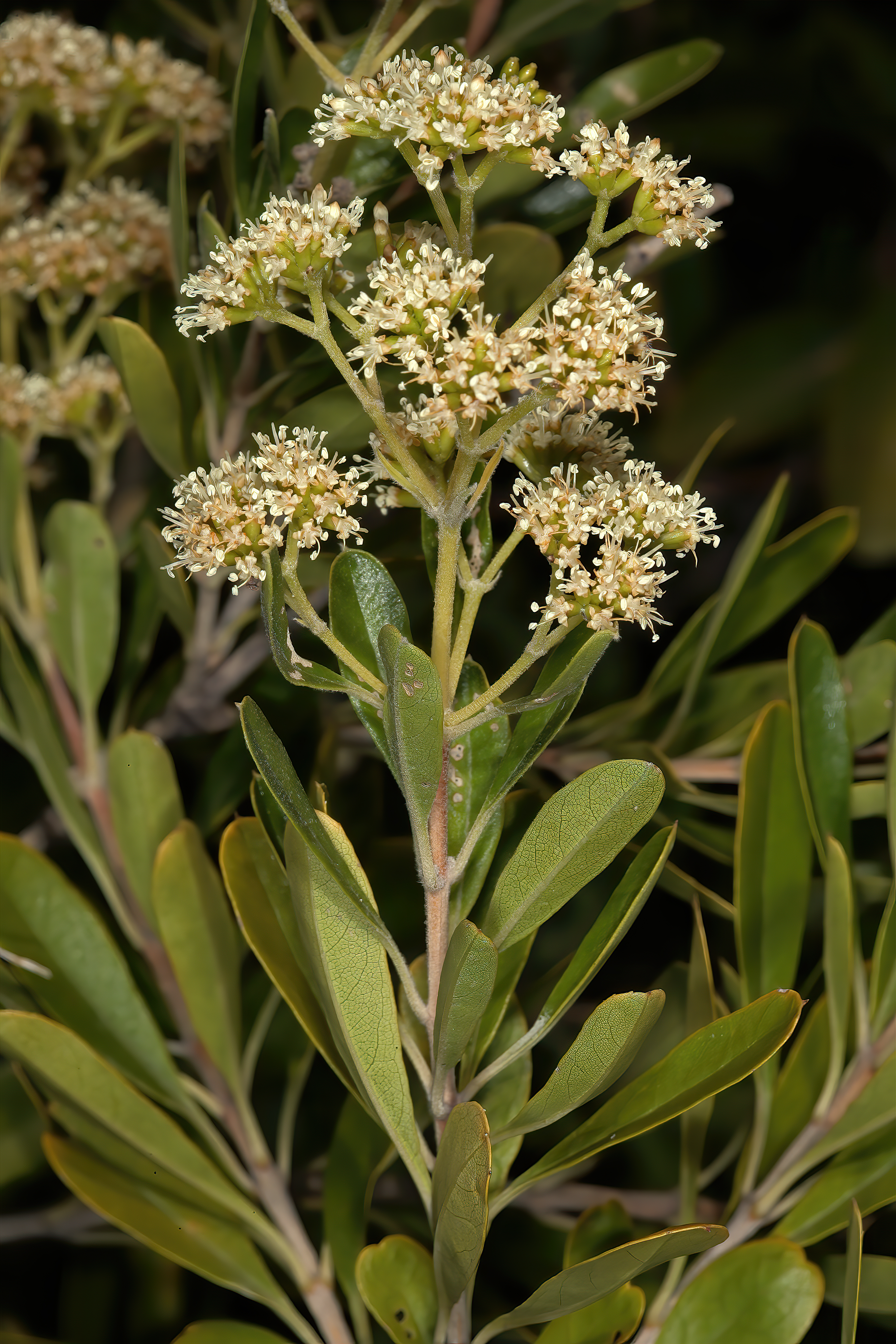
- Nuxia glomerulata, inflorescence

Conservation status
- Near Threatened (IUCN 2.3)

Scientific classification
- Kingdom: Plantae
- Clade: Tracheophytes
- Clade: Angiosperms
- Clade: Eudicots
- Clade: Asterids
- Order: Lamiales
- Family: Stilbaceae
- Genus: Nuxia
- Species: N. glomerulata

Binomial name
- Nuxia glomerulata (C.A.Sm.) I.Verd.

Synonyms
- Lachnopylis glomerulata C.A.Sm.; Lachnopylis suaveolens C.A.Sm.

= Nuxia glomerulata =

Species of flowering plant

Nuxia glomerulata is a species of plant in the Stilbaceae family. It is a shrub or tree endemic to the Northern Provinces of South Africa, where it has a restricted range between Pretoria and Zeerust. It resembles Nuxia congesta but the leaves are more elliptic, leathery and glabrous. It is threatened by habitat loss.
