= Euthystachys =

Scientific classification
- Kingdom: Plantae
- Clade: Embryophytes
- Clade: Tracheophytes
- Clade: Spermatophytes
- Clade: Angiosperms
- Clade: Eudicots
- Clade: Asterids
- Order: Lamiales
- Family: Stilbaceae
- Genus: Euthystachys; A.DC.
- Species: E. abbreviata

Binomial name
- Euthystachys abbreviata (E.Mey.) A.DC.

Synonyms
- Campylostachys abbreviata E.Mey. 1838 not E.Mey. 1843 (Cyperaceae)

Genus of flowering plants

Euthystachys is a genus of flowering plants in the family Stilbaceae described as a genus in 1848. There is only one known species, Euthystachys abbreviata, native to the Cape Province region in South Africa.
