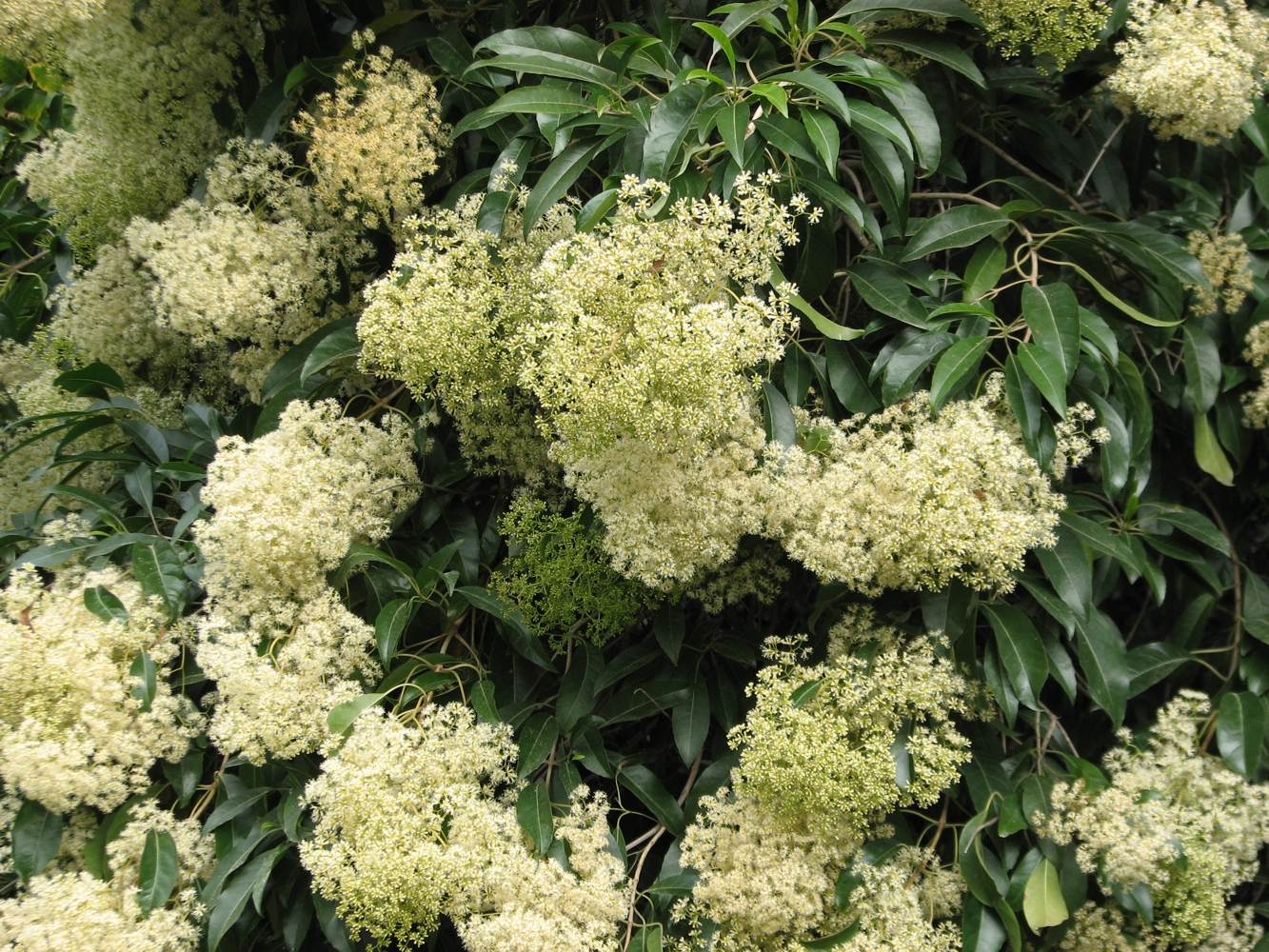
- Foliage and inflorescences

Conservation status
- Least Concern (IUCN 3.1)

Scientific classification
- Kingdom: Plantae
- Clade: Embryophytes
- Clade: Tracheophytes
- Clade: Spermatophytes
- Clade: Angiosperms
- Clade: Eudicots
- Clade: Asterids
- Order: Lamiales
- Family: Stilbaceae
- Genus: Nuxia
- Species: N. floribunda

Binomial name
- Nuxia floribunda Benth.

Synonyms
- Lachnopylis polyantha (Gilg) C.A.Sm.; Nuxia floribunda var. holstii Gilg; Nuxia holstii (Gilg) Gilg; Nuxia polyantha Gilg; Nuxia usambarensis Gilg; Nuxia volkensii Gilg

= Nuxia floribunda =

Species of tree

Nuxia floribunda, the forest elder, forest nuxia or wild elder, is a species of tree in the Stilbaceae family, that is native to moist regions of southern Africa, East Africa and central tropical Africa.

== Description ==
It usually grows to between 3 and 10 metres tall, although it occasionally may grow as tall as 25 metres. It has a crooked trunk, rough flaking bark and a rounded canopy. Large panicles of sweetly scented small white to cream flowers are produced from autumn to spring.

== Range and habitat ==
The species is native to southern and eastern Africa, from South Africa, through Eswatini, Zimbabwe, Mozambique, Zambia, Malawi, Tanzania, Burundi, Rwanda, eastern Democratic Republic of the Congo, to Uganda and Kenya.

It is a characteristic species of undifferentiated Afromontane forest in southern and eastern Africa.
