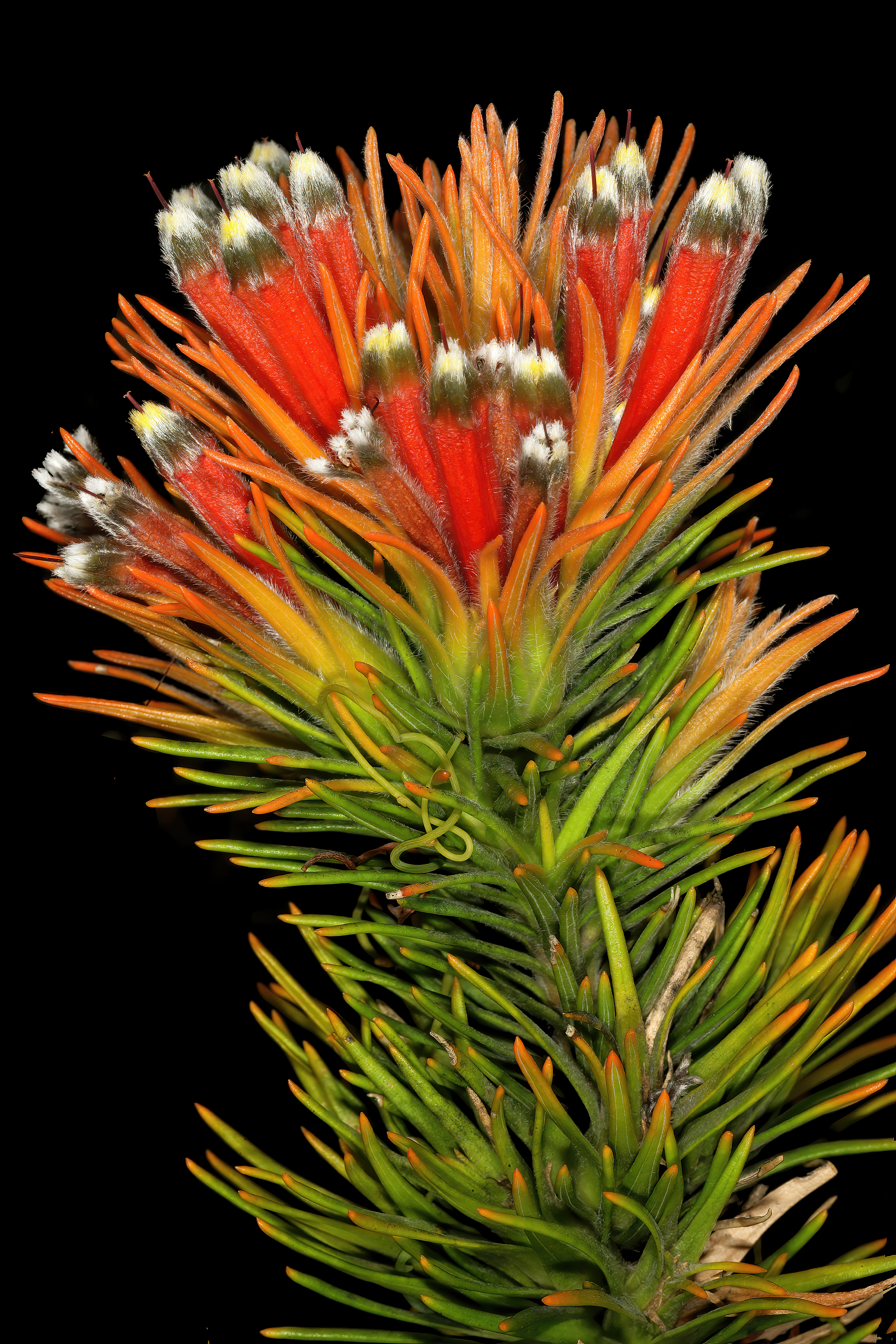

Scientific classification
- Kingdom: Plantae
- Clade: Embryophytes
- Clade: Tracheophytes
- Clade: Spermatophytes
- Clade: Angiosperms
- Clade: Eudicots
- Clade: Asterids
- Order: Lamiales
- Family: Stilbaceae
- Genus: Retzia; Thunberg
- Species: R. capensis

Binomial name
- Retzia capensis Thunberg

Synonyms
- Retzia spicata Thunb. ex L.f.; Retzia spicata J.F.Gmel.; Retzia campanuloides (L.f.) Spreng.; Retzia roelloides (L.f.) Spreng.

= Retzia =

Genus of flowering plants

Retzia is a genus of flowering plants in the family Stilbaceae described as a genus in 1776.

There is only one known species, Retzia capensis, native to the Cape Province region in South Africa.

It is reported to be pollinated by the orange-breasted sunbird.
