= Valentine Allorge =

Russian-French botanist and bryologist (1888-1977)

Valia (Valentine) Selitsky Allorge (1888–1977) was a Russian-French botanist, phycologist, and bryologist known for studying the flora of the Pyrenees region. Allorge's most important work was on the bryoflora of the Bussaco forest, Portugal, and she also spent several years cataloguing the bryophytes of Spain. The standard author abbreviation V.Allorge is used to indicate this person as the author when citing a botanical name.

She was born in the Russian Empire and emigrated to Nice in France before the start of World War I. She studied in Switzerland and then at the University of Paris. At the University of Paris she worked in the lab of Gaston Bonnier. It was also at the University of Paris she met her first husband, C.-L. Gatin, who was a botanist. He was killed as a soldier in the French Army in World War I in 1916.

In 1920 she married Pierre Allorge. Her husband was the editor of Revue Bryologique, which she continued to edit after his death in 1944. She issued four series of bryophyte exsiccatae in the time span between 1938 and 1949, the first two together with her husband. All series are devoted to bryophytes from outside Europe with titles like Cryptogames de l' empire colonial Français. Bryophytes. Série A.
