= Pierre Allorge =

French botanist

Pierre Allorge (12 April 1891 – 21 January 1944) was a French botanist born in Paris. His wife, Valentine Allorge (1888–1977) was a noted bryologist.

He studied natural sciences in Paris, obtaining his doctorate with a thesis titled Les Associations végétales du Vexin français. In 1933 he became chair of cryptogamy at the Muséum d'histoire naturelle. In 1937 he was appointed president of the Société botanique de France. Between 1928 and 1938 he issued the exsiccata Bryotheca Iberica. Muscinées de l'Espagne et du Portugal. Together with his wife Valentine Allorge he published two further bryophyte exsiccatae in 1938 and 1942.

In 1924 he founded the journal Revue algologique with Gontran Hamel (1883–1944).

== Written works ==
- Sur quelques groupements aquatiques et hygrophyles des Alpes Briançonnais, 1925 – On some aquatic and hygrophilous groups of the Briançon Alps.
- Histoire ou peuplement de la Corse : étude biogéographique, 1926 – History/settlement of Corsica, biogeographical study.
- Contribution à la flore hépaticologique des îles Açores, 1938 – Contributions to the hepaticological flora of the Azores.
- Essai de bryogéographie de la péninsule Ibérique, 1947 – Bryogeographical essay on the Iberian Peninsula.
