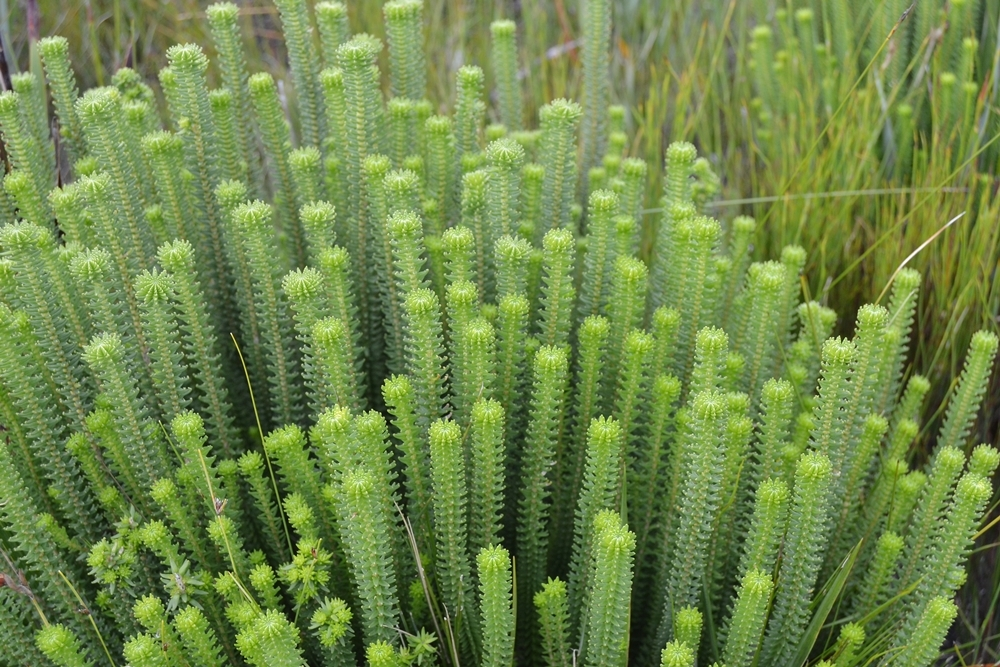
- Kogelbergia phylicoides in the Spioenkop Nature Reserve in South Africa

Scientific classification
- Kingdom: Plantae
- Clade: Tracheophytes
- Clade: Angiosperms
- Clade: Eudicots
- Clade: Asterids
- Order: Lamiales
- Family: Stilbaceae
- Genus: Kogelbergia; Rourke

= Kogelbergia =

Genus of flowering plants

Kogelbergia is a genus of flowering plants in the family Stilbaceae described as a genus in 2000.

The entire genus is endemic to the Cape Province region of South Africa.

Species

1. Kogelbergia phylicoides (A.DC.) Rourke
2. Kogelbergia verticillata (Eckl. & Zeyh.) Rourke
