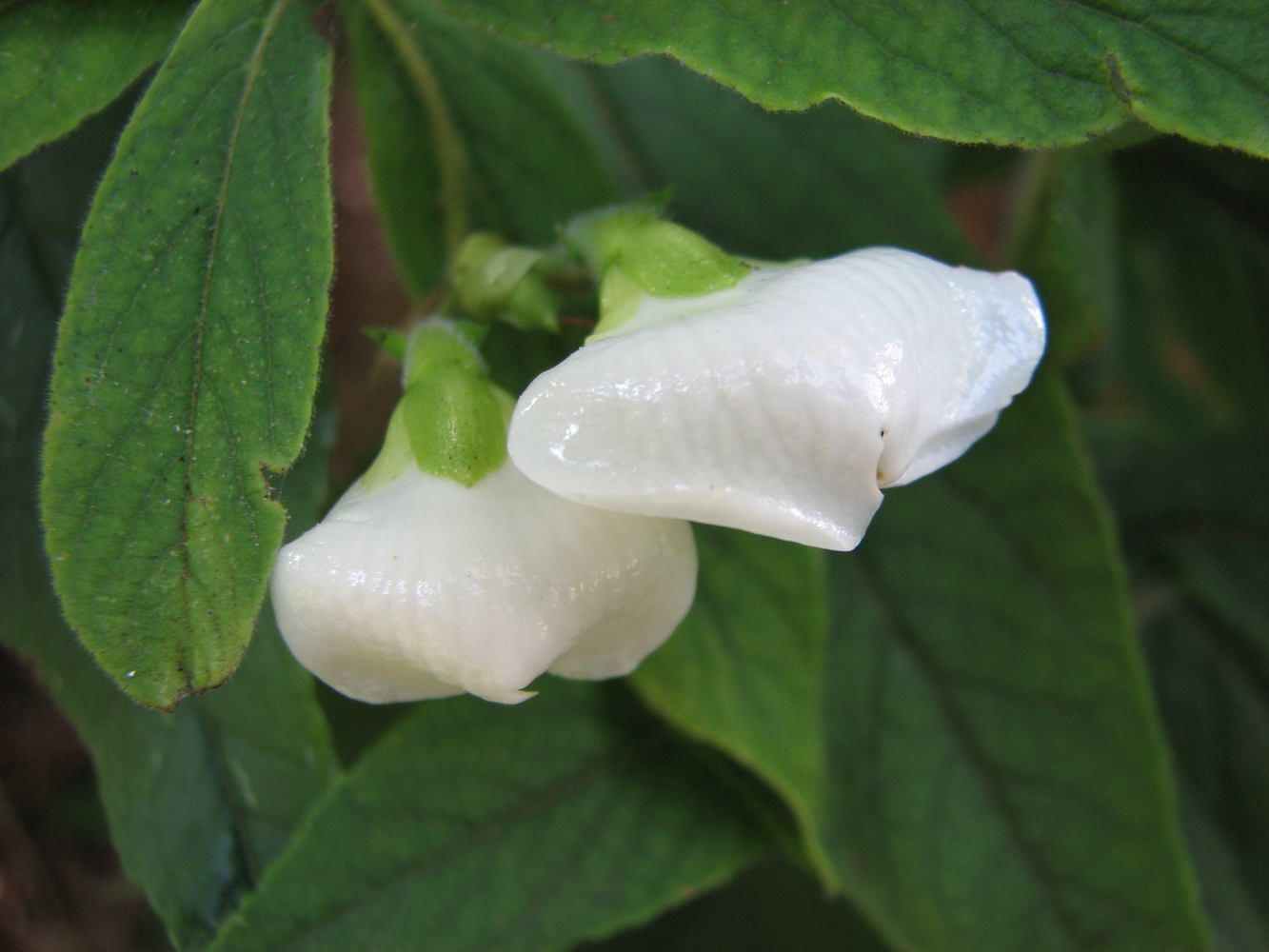
- Bowkeria verticillata

Scientific classification
- Kingdom: Plantae
- Clade: Embryophytes
- Clade: Tracheophytes
- Clade: Spermatophytes
- Clade: Angiosperms
- Clade: Eudicots
- Clade: Asterids
- Order: Lamiales
- Family: Stilbaceae; Kunth

Type genus
- Stilbe

Genera
- See text

Synonyms
- Retziaceae

= Stilbaceae =

Family of flowering plants

Stilbaceae is a family of flowering plants in the order Lamiales.

The family is found in Africa and the Mascarene Islands. It was first described in 1831.

The family consists of small trees or shrubs. Most species have small flowers, which can be white to red. The fruits are capsules.

== Genera ==
The family contains twelve genera:

- Anastrabe E. Mey. ex Benth.
- Bowkeria Harv.
- Campylostachys Kunth
- Charadrophila Marloth
- Euthystachys A. DC.
- Halleria L.
- Ixianthes Benth.
- Kogelbergia Rourke
- Nuxia Comm. ex Lam.
- Retzia Thunb.
- Stilbe P. J. Bergius
- Thesmophora Rourke

== Taxonomy ==
Stilbaceae was first named in 1831, by Carl Sigismund Kunth. The type genus is Stilbe. It was first described as a family by Stephan Endlicher. Hans Melchior described it as a subfamily, whereas George Bentham and Joseph Dalton Hooker described it as a tribe.

Stilbaceae have traditionally been regarded as part of Verbenaceae, or as allied to it.

== Distribution ==
Stilbaceae are found in Africa (including Madagascar), and the Mascarene Islands. Most are endemic to the cape Floristic Region. Aside from Nuxia, most Stilbaceae are heath plants, which grow in sun-exposed, fire-prone habitats, which experience cool, damp winters. Most species grow on well-drained mountain slopes.

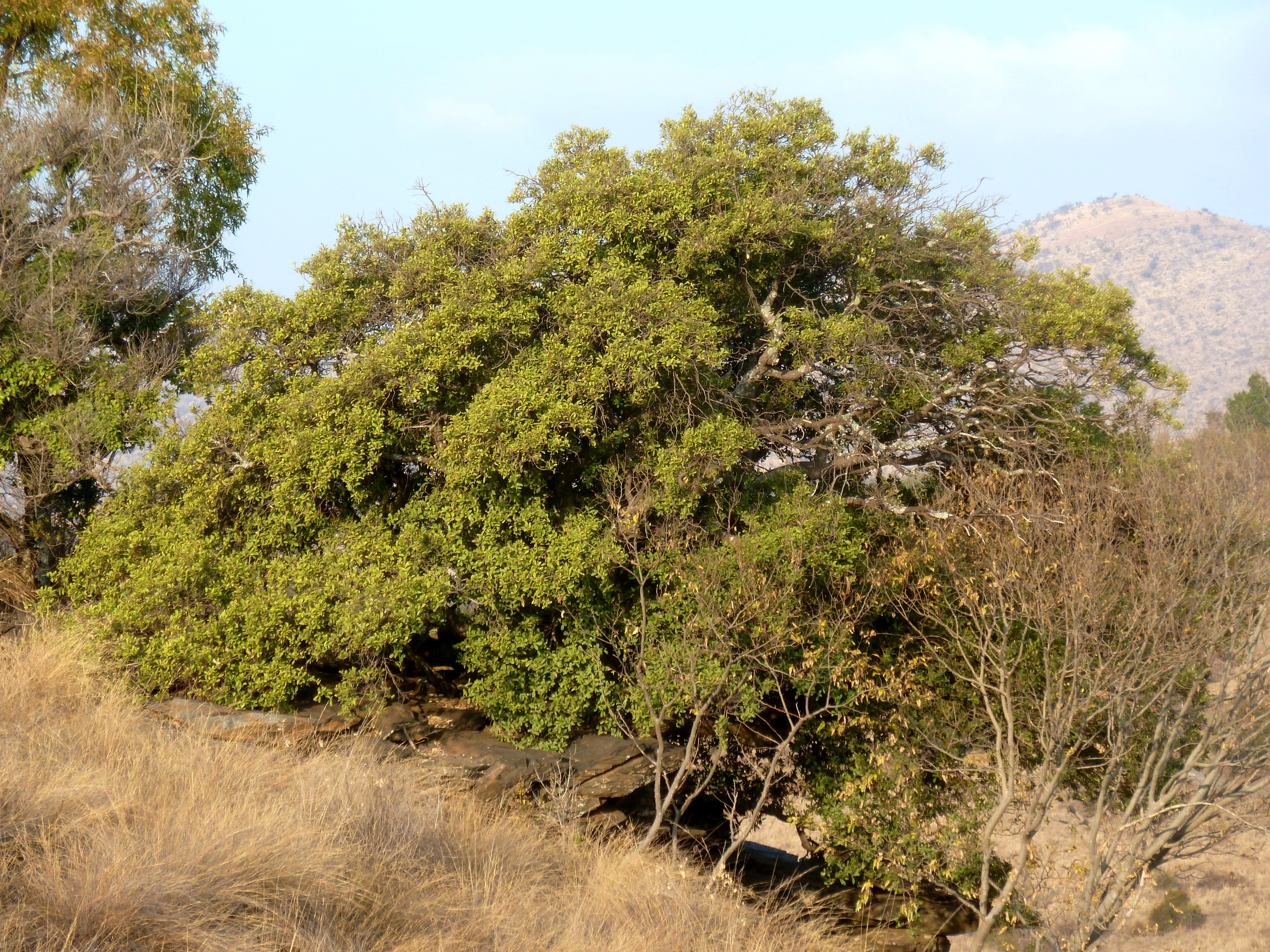
Nuxia congesta

== Description ==
The family consists of small trees and shrubs. All are woody perennials, and some are adapted to dry habitats. The shrubs have a single stem, or multiple stems growing from a lignotuber. Some species resprout from a lignotuber after fires. The young branches often have minute hairs.

The leaves normally have stems. They may be arranged oppositely, in groups of three, or in dense whorls with up to eight leaves. The leaves are simple, and usually small and sharply pointed (except in Nuxia). The leaves are persistent, and fall off after two to four years.

The flowers have both male and female reproductive organs. They usually have four or five stamens.

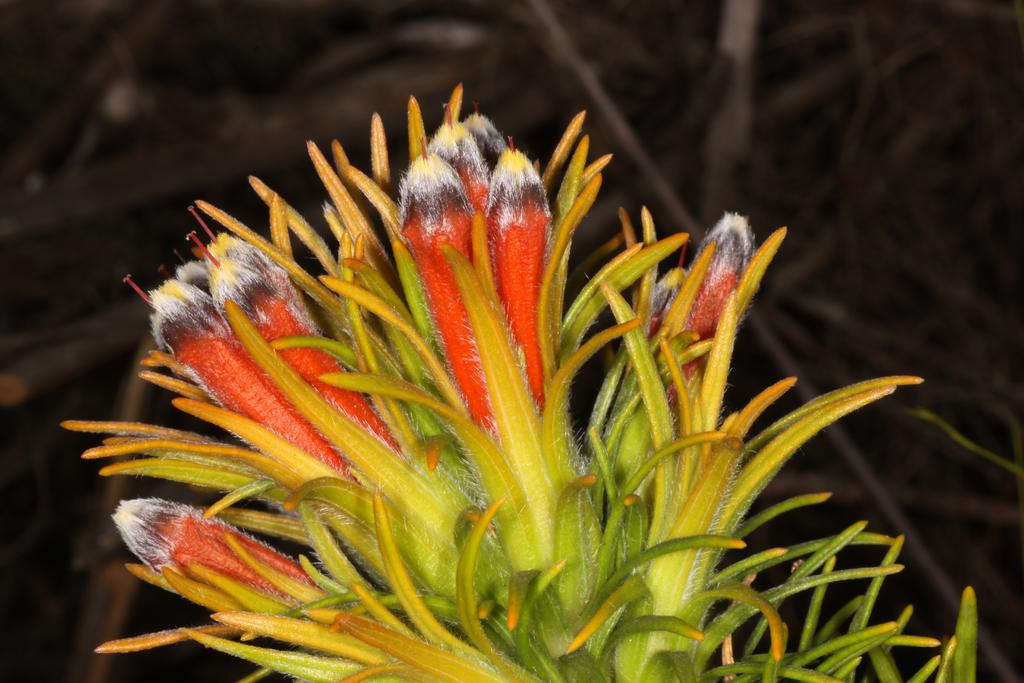
Retzia capensis

In most Stilbaceae, the flowers are less than 1 centimetre (0.39 in) long (though those of Retzia are up to 6.5 centimetres (2.6 in) long). The calyx has four to five sepals, which usually fuse and form a tube. The corolla is white to red, and is cylindrical or funnel-shaped. The inflorescences are highly variable in appearance. In some genera, such as Retzia, the flowers are clustered on side shoots. In Kogelbergia, the flower heads may be a condensed panicle.

The fruits are dehiscent capsules. The seeds are ovoid or rod-shaped, and are usually around 2 millimetres (0.079 in) long (though they are up to 6 millimetres (0.24 in) long in Retzia).

== Phytochemistry ==
C-8 iridoid glycosides are found in Nuxia, Stilbe, and Retzia.
