= List of publications in chemistry =

This is a list of publications in chemistry, organized by field.

Some factors that correlate with publication notability include:

- Topic creator – A publication that created a new topic.
- Breakthrough – A publication that changed scientific knowledge significantly.
- Influence – A publication that has significantly influenced the world or has had a massive impact on the teaching of chemistry.

== Foundations ==
=== The Sceptical Chymist ===
- Boyle, Robert (1979) [1661]. The Sceptical Chymist. London; New York: J.M. Dent & Sons, Ltd.; E.P. Dutton & Co. OCLC 3165496.

Description: Boyle, in the form of a dialogue, argued that chemical theories should be firmly grounded in experiment before their acceptance, and for the foundation of chemistry as a science separate from medicine and alchemy.

Importance: Topic creator, Influence. Boyle, in this book, is the first to argue that experiment should form the basis of all theory, a common practice in chemistry today. He also explains a rudimentary atomic theory and the existence of chemical elements beyond the classic earth, fire, air, and water. He is seen as the father of chemistry, and this is his most celebrated book, with continued relevance to the present day.

=== Traité Élémentaire de Chimie ===
- Traité Élémentaire de Chimie (available in English as Elementary Treatise of Chemistry) - Antoine Lavoisier, 1789

Description: This book was intended as an introduction to new theories in chemistry and as such, was one of the first Chemistry textbooks.

Importance: Introduction, Influence. Aside from being one of the first chemistry textbooks, the book was one of the first to state the law of conservation of mass, define a chemical element, and contain a list of known elements.

=== Méthode de Nomenclature Chimique ===
- Guyton de Morveau, L. B.; Lavoisier, A. L.; Berthollet, C. L.; de Fourcroy, A. F.
- Méthode de Nomenclature Chimique, Paris, 1787, available in English as Chymical Nomenclature.
- Some details and a picture available at IUPAC nomenclature#History

Description: This publication laid out a logical system for naming chemical substances (mainly chemical elements and inorganic compounds).

Importance: Prior to this publication, a multitude of names were often used for the same substance. This publication led to an international consensus on how to name chemical substances.

=== A New System of Chemical Philosophy ===
- A New System of Chemical Philosophy - John Dalton, 1808–1827

Description: This book explained Dalton's theory of atoms and its applications to chemistry.

Importance: The book was one of the first to describe a modern atomic theory, a theory that lies at the basis of modern chemistry. It is the first to introduce a table of atomic and molecular weights. Of the five properties of atoms that Dalton listed, only two have been shown to be incorrect.

=== The Dependence Between the Properties of the Atomic Weights of the Elements ===
- The Dependence Between the Properties of the Atomic Weights of the Elements - Dmitri Mendeleev
- Zeitschrift für Chemie 12, 405–406 (1869)
- Online version

Description: In this pape,r the periodic table was introduced. The table in the above link is the original one.

Importance: Since then the table structure was changed and new elements were added to it.

== Organic chemistry ==
=== Science of Synthesis: Houben–Weyl Methods of Molecular Transformations ===
- Volume titles
- Thieme: Stuttgart, 48 volumes, 2000–2009 (print and electronic version available)

Description: Contains synthetic models selected by world-renowned experts, with full experimental procedures and background information. Considers methods from journals, books, and patent literature from the early 19th century up to the present day and presents important synthetic methods for all classes of compounds. Evaluates the preparative applicability and significance of the synthetic methods.

Importance: A reference publication.

=== March's Advanced Organic Chemistry: Reactions, Mechanisms, and Structure ===
- Michael B. Smith, Jerry March
- Wiley-Interscience, 5th edition, 2001, ISBN 0-471-58589-0
- Wiley-Interscience, 6th edition, 2007, ISBN 978-0-471-72091-1

Description: A comprehensive reference for organic chemistry with over 25,000 references.

Importance: A reference publication.

=== The Logic of Chemical Synthesis ===
- Elias James Corey, Xue-Min Cheng
- Wiley-Interscience, 1995, ISBN 0-471-11594-0

Description: Describes the logic underlying the rational design of complex organic synthesis.

Importance: Breakthrough, Influence.

=== Protective Groups in Organic Synthesis ===
- Theodora Greene, Peter G. M. Wuts
- Wiley-Interscience, 1st edition, 1981
- Wiley-Interscience, 2nd edition, 1991
- Wiley-Interscience, 3rd edition, 1999, ISBN 0-471-16019-9
- Wiley-Interscience, 4th edition, 2007, ISBN 0-471-69754-0
- Wiley-Interscience, 5th edition, 2014, ISBN 9781118057483

Description: A comprehensive reference for the usage of protecting groups in organic synthesis.

Importance: A reference publication.

=== Comprehensive Organic Transformations ===
- Richard C. Larock
- Wiley-VCH
- 1st edition:
- 2nd edition: 1999, ISBN 0-471-19031-4

Description: A standard reference for the practicing organic chemist. These books are lists of key references indexed by functional group transformations.

Importance: A reference publication.

=== Stereochemistry of Carbon Compounds ===
- Ernest L. Eliel
- 1st edition: 1962
- Current edition: renamed Stereochemistry of Organic Compounds, 1994 (by Eliel and Samuel H. Wilen)

Description: Systematic and complete exposition of all aspects of organic stereochemistry.

Importance: Standard advanced text for organic stereochemistry.

=== The Conservation of Orbital Symmetry ===
- Robert Burns Woodward and Roald Hoffmann
- Verlag Chemie Academic Press
- 1st edition: 1970

Description: This book summarizes a series of publications (the first in 1965) by the Nobel Prize winning authors where they describe the mechanism of a series of pericyclic reactions based upon the conservation of orbital symmetry leading to what are now called the Woodward–Hoffmann rules.

Importance: The concepts outlined in this text changed the field of organic chemistry and introduced the frontier molecular orbital theory approach toward understanding reactions.

=== Classics in Total Synthesis ===
- K.C. Nicolaou and E.J. Sorensen
- Current edition: 1996

Description: The synthesis of famous molecules.

Importance: A standard postgraduate text book for the study of total synthesis and a reference work for experts.

== Inorganic chemistry ==
=== Chemical Applications of Group Theory ===
- F. Albert Cotton
- Wiley, John & Sons, Incorporated, 1st Ed. 1963, 3rd Ed. 1990.

Description: Explains the use of symmetry groups in describing molecular symmetry and its role in determining molecular properties.

Importance: Influence by introducing group theory to a wider group of chemists.

=== Advanced Inorganic Chemistry ===
- F. Albert Cotton and Geoffrey Wilkinson
- Wiley, John & Sons, Incorporated, 1st Ed. 1962, 6th Ed. 1999

Description: A classic general textbook for an undergraduate course in inorganic chemistry.

Importance: This book is an introduction to the subject. It led to a shift in the way in which inorganic chemistry was studied". Every new text in inorganic chemistry since this text responds to it.

=== Inorganic and Theoretical Chemistry ===
- F. Sherwood Taylor and H. M. N. H. Irving
- Heinemann, 1st Ed 1931, 10th Ed. 1960

Description: Comprehensive descriptions of all known compounds at the time of publication. Approaches chemistry as the study of elements and compounds without an emphasis on bond theory and analysis.

Importance: A textbook for scientists and students.

=== Chemistry of the Elements ===
- N. N. Greenwood and A. Earnshaw
- Heinemann (later Elsevier), 1st Ed 1984, 2nd Ed 1997

Description: Comprehensive coverage of all known elements and their compounds, with a strong focus on practical and industrial applications.

Importance: Comprehensive one-volume text on inorganic chemistry; a successor to Taylor and Irving (see above).

== Physical chemistry ==
=== Physical Chemistry (Atkins and de Paula) ===
- P. W. Atkins
- Oxford University Press, 1st Ed. 1978, 10th Ed. 2014 (with Julio de Paula from 7th Ed. 2002)

Description: A classic general textbook for an undergraduate course in physical chemistry. The current edition is the 10th edition.

Importance: Introduced the subject of chemistry. It altered the way physical chemistry was taught. The first edition was widely used where English is the language of instruction.

=== Physical Chemistry (Berry, Rice and Ross) ===
- R. Stephen Berry, Stuart A. Rice, and John Ross
- Oxford University Press, 1st Ed. 1980, 2nd Ed. 2000

Description: An encyclopedic text and reference for advanced undergraduate or graduate study.

Importance: This text written by researchers begins with simple systems and proceeds logically to the more complex phenomena of physical chemistry. The original literature is cited extensively, making the work both a functional reference and a textbook. Many topics of recent research at the time of publication are covered in both editions. It covers the field and modern topics.

=== Methods in Physical Chemistry (Schäfer, Schmidt) ===
- Rolf Schäfer, Peter C. Schmidt
- Wiley‐VCH Verlag GmbH & Co. KGaA, 2012

Description: An overview of commonly used methods in physical chemistry and their practical aspects.

Importance: Reference for students in their master and doctoral theses.

== Biochemistry ==
=== "A Structure for Deoxyribose Nucleic Acid" ===
- James D. Watson and Francis Crick
- Nature 171, 737–738 (1953) © Macmillan Publishers Ltd.
- Downloadable PDF

Description: In this paper, the structure of DNA was proposed. It consisted of a double helix with a phosphate backbone, unlike Linus Pauling and R.B. Corey's double helix where the backbone consisted of the bases. The paper concludes with the acknowledgement: "It has not escaped our notice that the specific pairing we have postulated immediately suggests a possible copying mechanism for the genetic material."

Importance: Topic creator, Breakthrough, Influence

=== "The Structure of the Potassium Channel: Molecular Basis of K+ Conduction and Selectivity" ===
- Declan A. Doyle, João Morais Cabral, Richard A. Pfuetzner, Anling Kuo, Jacqueline M. Gulbis, Steven L. Cohen, Brian T. Chait and Roderick MacKinnon
- Science 280(5360), 69–77 (1998) © American Association for the Advancement of Science
- Online version

Description: The structure of the potassium channel is determined by X-ray crystallography, answering certain questions regarding the movement of ions across the cell membrane. In particular, the structure revealed the mechanism with by which these channels move potassium ions, preventing similarly sized sodium ions from passing through.

Importance Breakthrough, Influence

== Analytical chemistry ==
=== Statistics for Experimenters: An Introduction to Design, Data Analysis, and Model Building ===
- George E.P. Box, J. Stuart Hunter & William G. Hunter
- John Wiley and Sons, Inc., 1st Edition 1978, 2nd Edition 2005 (ISBN 978-0-471-71813-0)

Description: Starting with examples comparing two sets of experimental data, this text explains variance and the calculation of standard deviations, degrees of freedom, the null hypothesis and the "Student's" t-Test by William J. Gosset. Further chapters discuss the importance of randomization and the analysis of variance (ANOVA) using F distributions before explaining the use of statistically designed experiments including block and factorial designs. The book finishes with least squares regression analysis along with response surface and mechanistic modeling.

Importance: Although almost devoid of classical chemistry, this is a reference for experimentalists or any chemist measuring or studying the properties or effects of chemical compounds, mixtures or other substances. Though chemical examples were few, co-author William G. Hunter, George Box's protégé, had a Bachelor's and a master's degree in Chemical Engineering, and the book can apply to chemical investigations.

== Polymer chemistry ==
=== Principles of Polymer Chemistry ===
- Flory, Paul J. (1953)
- Cornell University Press. 1953, ISBN 0-8014-0134-8.

Description: Discusses structure and stereochemistry of synthetic polymers, polymerization kinetics, behaviour of polymers in solution, chain dimensions.

Importance: First major text on polymer chemistry; presents both organic and physical chemistry aspects. Written by Paul Flory, a chemist who made major contributions to the physical chemistry of polymers, for which he won the Nobel prize in 1974.

== Environmental chemistry ==
=== Aquatic Chemistry, Chemical Equilibria and Rates in Natural Waters ===
- Stumm, Werner and James J. Morgan.
- John Wiley and Sons, Inc., 1st Edition 1970, 3rd Edition 1996, ISBN 0-471-51185-4.

Description: This book covers acid and base equilibria, carbonate chemistry, mass transfer, complexation, sorption phenomenon, oxidation and reduction, colloid chemistry, flocculation and coagulation. The authors generally present the material by emphasizing fundamental principles of thermodynamics and kinetics.

Importance: The publication is one of the most widely cited texts in environmental chemistry. In 1999, Stumm and Morgan received the Stockholm Water Prize for their contributions in the field. The citation specifically mentioned Aquatic Chemistry, where it was described as a "seminal book" that is "used in education all over the world".

=== "Stratospheric sink for chlorofluoromethanes: chlorine atom-catalysed destruction of ozone" ===
Mario J. Molina and F. S. Rowland, Nature 249, 810–812 (1974)

Description: This paper warned of the danger of ozone depletion due to man-made chlorofluorocarbons. The main atmospheric sink for these compounds was identified as ultraviolet photolysis, liberating chlorine atoms which catalyze the destruction of stratospheric ozone and have the potential to significantly deplete the ozone layer.

Importance: Influence, as described in the presentation speech for the Nobel Prize in Chemistry 1995: “The findings presented by this year's laureates in chemistry have had an enormous political and industrial impact. This was because they clearly identified unacceptable environmental hazards in a large, economically important sector.”

== Chemical thermodynamics ==
=== "On the Equilibrium of Heterogeneous Substances" ===
- Gibbs, Willard
- Trans. Conn. Acad., Vol. III, pp. 108–248, 1876; pp. 343–524, 1878.

Description: Applied the thermodynamic theory of steam engines to atomic level chemical reactions; i.e., it established equilibrium criteria necessary to predict the thermodynamic tendency of chemical reactions at constant temperature and pressure.

Importance: Topic creator; historian Bill Bryson states, in his A Short History of Nearly Everything, that Gibbs’ Equilibrium paper is "the Principia of thermodynamics". This papers functions as the mathematical foundation of physical chemistry.

== Electrochemistry ==
=== Electrochemical Methods: Fundamentals and Applications ===
- Allen J. Bard, Larry R. Faulkner
- John Wiley and Sons, 2nd edition, 2000, ISBN 0-471-04372-9

Description: Reference for electrochemistry, coupling thousands of electroanalytical methods with the theory behind them.

Importance: A reference publication.

== Theoretical chemistry, quantum chemistry and computational chemistry ==
=== Valence and the structure of atoms and molecules ===
- Gilbert N. Lewis
- New York, The Chemical Catalog Company, Inc., 1923.

Description: Discusses ionic and covalent bonding (polar and non-polar).

Importance: The book introduces the modern concept of the covalent bond as the sharing of electron pairs, and tries to reconcile the chemist's empirical view of the atom with the physicist's and spectroscopist's quantum mechanical view. It could be considered a precursor to Pauling's books.

=== Introduction to Quantum Mechanics with Applications to Chemistry ===
- Linus Pauling, E. Bright Wilson
- New York, London, McGraw-Hill book company, 1935.

Description: An introduction to quantum mechanics.

Importance: One of the earliest books that introduced quantum mechanics to chemists.

=== Valence ===
- C. A Coulson
- Oxford, Clarendon Press, 1952.
- The latest edition is called Coulson's Valence, 3rd Edition, Roy McWeeny, Oxford University Press, 1980

Description: A classic introduction to valence and the theory of chemical binding.

Importance: This book is credited with the increase of attention to the molecular orbital theory from the 1950s.

=== The Nature of the Chemical Bond and the Structure of Molecules and Crystals; An Introduction to Modern Structural Chemistry ===
- Linus Pauling
- Ithaca, N.Y., London, Cornell University Press; H. Milford, Oxford University Press, 1940.

Description: The first general book to introduce quantum mechanics to chemists.

Importance: Introduced quantum mechanics and, in particular, valence bond theory to experimental chemists.

=== Density-Functional Theory of Atoms and Molecules ===
- R. G. Parr and W. Yang,
- Oxford University Press, New York, 1989.

Description: An account of density functional theory.

Importance: Introduction to the subject. It describes how theory explains chemical concepts such as electronegativity.

=== Car–Parrinello molecular dynamics ===
- Roberto Car and Michele Parrinello,
- Phys. Rev. Lett. 55, 2471 (1985)

Description: Unified Approach for molecular dynamics and density functional theory.

Importance: First demonstration of ab-initio molecular dynamics, where the forces are computed on-the-fly by means of quantum mechanical electronic structure calculations.

== Supramolecular chemistry ==
=== Supramolecular Chemistry – Concepts and Perspectives ===
- Jean-Marie Lehn
- ISBN 3-527-29311-6, VCH,

Description: Comprehensive textbook written by topic creator.

Importance: Most-popular textbook on subject (according to Amazon.com). Lehn coined the term "supermolecule" in 1973, developed the concept of supramolecular chemistry in 1978, and won the Nobel Prize for his supramolecular chemistry work in 1987.

=== Supramolecular Medicinal Chemistry ===
- Michael J. Zaworotko
- Brian D. Moulton

Description: Selected articles: "Supramolecular Medicinal Chemistry: Mixed-Ligand Coordination Complexes".Mol. Pharmaceutics, 2007, 4 (3), pp 373–385;"Pharmaceutical co-crystals".Journal of Pharmaceutical Sciences, 2006, 95 (3), pp 499–516;"Crystal engineering of pharmaceutical co-crystals from polymorphic active pharmaceutical ingredients". Chem. Commun., 2005, pp 4601 – 4603; "Recent advances of discrete coordination complexes and coordination polymers in drug delivery". Coord. Chem. Rev., 2011, 255, pp 1623–1641.

Importance: Breakthrough, Influence

== Medicinal chemistry ==
=== The Practice of Medicinal Chemistry ===
- Camille Georges Wermuth editor
- Academic Press, 1996, ISBN 0-12-744640-0
- 2nd edition, Academic Press, 2003, ISBN 0-12-744481-5

Description: An overview of the theory, methodology, and techniques of drug design.

Importance: Introduction, Influence

== See also ==
- List of scientific journals
- List of scientific journals in chemistry
