= Golding Bird =

British medical doctor (1814–1854)

Golding Bird FRS FRCP FLS FGS
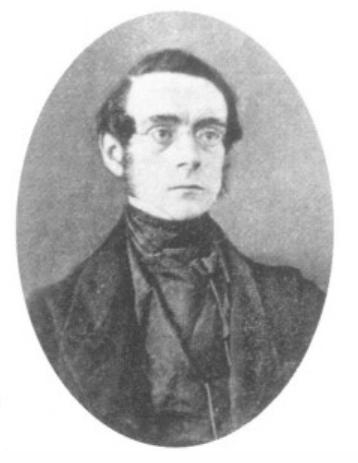
- Golding Bird, 1840
- Born: 9 December 1814; Downham Market, Norfolk, England
- Died: 27 August 1854 (aged 39); Tunbridge Wells, Kent, England
- Education: University of St Andrews (MD, MA)
- Occupation: Physician
- Known for: Creation of stethoscope
- Notable work: Elements of Natural Philosophy

Golding Bird FRS FRCP FLS FGS (9 December 1814 – 27 October 1854) was a British medical doctor and a Fellow of the Royal College of Physicians. He became a great authority on kidney diseases and published a comprehensive paper on urinary deposits in 1844. He was also notable for his work in related sciences, especially the medical uses of electricity and electrochemistry. From 1836, he lectured at Guy's Hospital, a well-known teaching hospital in London and now part of King's College London, and published a popular textbook on science for medical students called Elements of Natural Philosophy.

Having developed an interest in chemistry while still a child, largely through self-study, Bird was far enough advanced to deliver lectures to his fellow pupils at school. He later applied this knowledge to medicine and did much research on the chemistry of urine and of kidney stones. In 1842, he was the first to describe oxaluria, a condition which leads to the formation of a particular kind of stone.

Bird, who was a member of the London Electrical Society, was innovative in the field of the medical use of electricity, designing much of his own equipment. In his time, electrical treatment had acquired a bad name in the medical profession through its widespread use by quack practitioners. Bird made efforts to oppose this quackery, and was instrumental in bringing medical electrotherapy into the mainstream. He was quick to adopt new instruments of all kinds; he invented a new variant of the Daniell cell in 1837 and made important discoveries in electrometallurgy with it. He was not only innovative in the electrical field, but he also designed a flexible stethoscope, and in 1840 published the first description of such an instrument.

A devout Christian, Bird believed Bible study and prayer were just as important to medical students as their academic studies. He endeavoured to promote Christianity among medical students and encouraged other professionals to do likewise. To this end, Bird was responsible for the founding of the Christian Medical Association, although it did not become active until after his death. Bird suffered from poor health throughout his life and died at the age of 39.

== Life and career ==
Bird was born in Downham, Norfolk, England, on 9 December 1814. His father (also named Golding Bird) had been an officer in the Inland Revenue in Ireland, and his mother, Marrianne, was Irish. He was precocious and ambitious, but childhood rheumatic fever and endocarditis left him with poor posture and lifelong frail health. He received a classical education when he was sent with his brother Frederic to stay with a clergyman in Wallingford, where he developed a lifelong habit of self-study. From the age of 12, he was educated in London, at a private school that did not promote science and provided only a classical education. Bird, who seems to have been far ahead of his teachers in science, gave lectures in chemistry and botany to his fellow pupils. He had four younger siblings, of whom his brother Frederic also became a physician and published on botany.

In 1829, when he was 14, Bird left school to serve an apprenticeship with the apothecary William Pretty in Burton Crescent, London. He completed it in 1833 and was licensed to practise by the Worshipful Society of Apothecaries at Apothecaries' Hall in 1836. He received this licence without examination because of the reputation he had gained as a student at Guy's, the London teaching hospital where he had become a medical student in 1832 while still working at his apprenticeship. At Guy's he was influenced by Thomas Addison, who recognised his talents early on. Bird was an ambitious and very capable student. Early in his career he became a Fellow of the Senior Physical Society, for which a thesis was required. He received prizes for medicine, obstetrics, and ophthalmic surgery at Guy's and the silver medal for botany at Apothecaries' Hall. Around 1839 to 1840, he worked on breast disease at Guy's as an assistant to Sir Astley Cooper.

Bird graduated from the University of St Andrews with an MD in 1838 and an MA in 1840 while continuing to work in London. St Andrews required no residence or examination for the MD. Bird obtained his degree by submitting testimonials from qualified colleagues, which was common practice at the time. Once qualified in 1838, at the age of 23, he entered general practice with a surgery at 44 Seymour Street, Euston Square, London. He was unsuccessful at first because of his youth, but in the same year he became physician to the Finsbury Dispensary, a post he held for five years. By 1842, he had an income of £1000 a year from his private practice. Adjusted for inflation, this amounts to a spending power of about £98,000 now. At the end of his career, his income was just under £6000. He became a licentiate of the Royal College of Physicians in 1840, and a fellow in 1845.

Bird lectured on natural philosophy, medical botany and urinary pathology from 1836 to 1853 at Guy's. He lectured on materia medica at Guy's from 1843 to 1853 and at the Royal College of Physicians from 1847 to 1849. He also lectured at the Aldersgate School of Medicine. Throughout his career, he published extensively, not only on medical matters, but also on electrical science and chemistry.

Bird became the first head of the electricity and galvanism department at Guy's in 1836, under the supervision of Addison, since Bird did not graduate until 1838. In 1843, he was appointed assistant physician at Guy's, a position for which he had lobbied hard, and that October he was put in charge of the children's outpatients ward. Like his electrotherapy patients, the children were largely poor relief cases who could not afford to pay for medical treatment and were much used for the training of medical students. It was generally accepted at this time that poor relief cases could be used for experimental treatment, and their permission was not required. Bird published in the hospital journal a series of reports on childhood diseases, based on case studies from this work.

Marrying Mary Ann Brett in 1842, Bird moved from his family home at 22 Wilmington Square, Clerkenwell, to 19 Myddelton Square. They had two daughters and three sons, the second of whom, Cuthbert Hilton Golding-Bird (1848–1939), became a notable surgeon. Another son, Percival Golding-Bird, became a priest in Rotherhithe.

Bird was a Fellow of the Linnaean Society (elected 1836), the Geological Society (elected 1836) and the Royal Society (elected 1846). He joined the Pathological Society of London (which eventually merged into the Royal Society of Medicine) when it was formed in 1846. He also belonged to the London Electrical Society founded by William Sturgeon and others. This body was very unlike the elite scholarly institutions; it was more like a craft guild with a penchant for spectacular demonstrations. Nevertheless, it had some notable members, and new machines and apparatus were regularly discussed and demonstrated. Bird was also a Freemason from 1841 and was the Worshipful Master of the St Paul's lodge in 1850. He left the Freemasons in 1853.

Bird was described as vain, with a tendency to self-promotion, and his driving ambition occasionally led him into conflict with others. He was involved in a number of very public disputes in contemporary medical journals, including the dispute with the Pulvermacher Company and a dispute over the development of the stethoscope. He was said to give his patients his undivided attention and a complete commitment to their welfare. He was a fine speaker, a good lecturer and an eloquent debater.

The Golding Bird Gold Medal for sanitary science

Diagnosed with heart disease by his brother in 1848 or 1849, Bird was forced to stop work. By 1850, however, he was again working as hard as ever and had extended his practice so much that he needed to move to a larger house in Russell Square. In 1851, acute rheumatism led Bird to take an extended holiday with his wife in Tenby, where he pursued investigations in botany, marine fauna and cave life as pastimes. These long summer breaks were repeated in 1852 and 1853 at Torquay and Tenby. Even on holiday, his fame caused him to receive many requests for consultations. In 1853, he purchased an estate, St Cuthbert, for his retirement in Tunbridge Wells, but it needed some work, and he could not leave London until June 1854. Meanwhile, he continued to see patients, but only in his house, despite seriously deteriorating health. He died on 27 October 1854 at St Cuthbert from a urinary tract infection and suffering from kidney stones. His early death at 39 may have been due to a combination of lifelong frail health and overwork, which Bird himself knew to be destroying him. He is buried in Woodbury Park Cemetery, Tunbridge Wells.

After his death, Mary instituted the Golding Bird Gold Medal and Scholarship for sanitary science, later named the Golding Bird Gold Medal and Scholarship for bacteriology, which was awarded annually at Guy's teaching hospital. The prize was instituted in 1887 and was still being awarded in 1983, but is no longer given. From 1934 onwards, a Golding Bird Gold Medal and Scholarship was also awarded for obstetrics and gynaecology. Among the recipients of the medal were Nathaniel Ham (1896), Alfred Salter (1897), Russell Brock (1926), Smarn Muntarbhorn (1940), John Beale (1945), and D. Bernard Amos (circa 1947–1951).

== Collateral sciences ==
The collateral sciences are those sciences that have an important role in medicine but do not form part of medicine themselves, especially physics, chemistry, and botany (because botany is a rich source of drugs and poisons). Until the end of the first half of the 19th century, chemical analysis was rarely used in medical diagnosis – there was even hostility to the idea in some quarters. Most of the work in this area at that time was carried out by researchers associated with Guy's.

By the time Golding Bird was a medical student at Guy's, the hospital already had a tradition of studying physics and chemistry as they related to medicine. Bird followed this tradition and was particularly influenced by the work of William Prout, an expert in chemical physiology. Bird became well known for his knowledge of chemistry. An early example dates from 1832, when he commented on a paper on the copper sulphate test for arsenic poisoning, delivered by his future brother-in-law R. H. Brett to the Pupils' Physical Society. Bird criticised the test's positive result when a green precipitate was formed, claiming the test was inconclusive because precipitates other than copper arsenite can produce the same green colour.

Bird did not limit himself to challenging his future brother-in-law. In 1834, Bird and Brett published a paper on the analysis of blood serum and urine, in which they argued against some work by Prout. Prout had said (in 1819) that the pink sediment in urine was due to the presence of ammonium purpurate, but Bird's tests failed to verify this. Though Bird was still only a student and Prout held great authority, Prout felt it necessary to reply to the challenge. In 1843, Bird tried to identify the pink compound; he failed, but was convinced it was a new chemical and gave it the name purpurine. This name did not stick, however, and the compound became known as uroerythrin from the work of Franz Simon. Its structure was identified only in 1975.

Around 1839, recognising Bird's abilities in chemistry, Astley Cooper asked him to contribute to his book on breast disease. Bird wrote a piece on the chemistry of milk, and the book was published in 1840. Although the book is primarily about human anatomy, it includes a chapter on comparative anatomy covering several species, for which Bird carried out an analysis of dog and porpoise milk. Also in 1839, Bird published his own Elements of Natural Philosophy, a textbook on physics for medical students. Taking the view that existing texts were too mathematical for medical students, Bird avoided such material in favour of clear explanations. The book proved popular and remained in print for 30 years, although some of its mathematical shortcomings were made good in the fourth edition by Charles Brooke.

=== Electricity ===
In 1836, Bird was put in charge of the newly formed department of electricity and galvanism under the supervision of Addison. While this was not the first hospital to employ electrotherapy, the field was still considered very experimental. Previous hospital uses had either been short-lived or based on the whim of a single surgeon, such as John Birch at St Thomas' Hospital. At Guy's, the treatment was part of the hospital system and became well known to the public, so much so that Guy's was parodied for its use of electricity in the New Frankenstein satirical magazine.

In his electrotherapy, Bird used both electrochemical and electrostatic machines (and later also electromagnetic induction machines) to treat a very wide range of conditions, such as some forms of chorea. Treatments included peripheral nerve stimulation, electrical muscle stimulation and electric shock therapy. Bird also used his invention, the electric moxa, to heal skin ulcers.

==== Electrical equipment ====
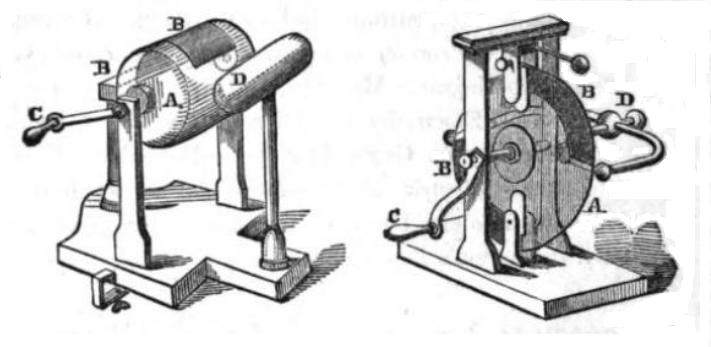
Friction electrostatic generators: cylinder (left) and disc (right) designs. According to Bird, the disc design has a greater power output, while the simpler construction of the cylinder makes it easier to operate.

It was already clear from the work of Michael Faraday that electricity and galvanism were essentially the same. Bird realised this, but continued to divide his apparatus into electrical machines, which (according to him) delivered a high voltage at low current, and galvanic apparatus, which delivered a high current at low voltage. The galvanic equipment available to Bird included electrochemical cells such as the voltaic pile and the Daniell cell, a variant of which Bird devised himself. Also part of the standard equipment were induction coils which, together with an interrupter circuit, were used with one of the electrochemical cells to deliver an electric shock. The electrical (as opposed to galvanic) machines then available were friction-operated electrostatic generators consisting of a rotating glass disc or cylinder on which silk flaps were allowed to drag as the glass rotated. These machines had to be hand-turned during treatment, but it was possible to store small amounts of static electricity in Leyden jars for later use.

By 1849, generators based on Faraday's law of induction had become advanced enough to replace both types of machines, and Bird was recommending them in his lectures. Galvanic cells suffered from the inconvenience of having to deal with the electrolyte acids in the surgery and the possibility of spillages; electrostatic generators required a great deal of skill and attention to keep them working successfully. Electromagnetic machines, on the other hand, have neither of these drawbacks; the only criticism levelled by Bird was that the cheaper machines could only deliver an alternating current. For medical use, particularly when treating a problem with nerves, a unidirectional current of a particular polarity was often needed, requiring the machine to have split rings or similar mechanisms. However, Bird considered alternating current machines suitable for cases of amenorrhœa.

The required direction of current depended on the direction in which electric current was thought to flow in nerves in the human or animal body. For motor functions, for instance, the flow was taken to be from the centre towards the muscles at the extremities, so artificial electrical stimulation needed to be in the same direction. For sensory nerves, the opposite applied: flow was from the extremity to the centre, and the positive electrode would be applied to the extremity. This principle was demonstrated by Bird in an experiment with a living frog. A supply of frogs was usually on hand, as they were used in the frog galvanoscope. The electromagnetic galvanometer was available at the time, but frogs' legs were still used by Bird because of their much greater sensitivity to small currents. In the experiment, the frog's leg was almost completely severed from its body, leaving only the sciatic nerve connected, and electric current was then applied from the body to the leg. Convulsions of the leg were seen when the muscle was stimulated. Reversing the current, however, produced no movement of the muscle, merely croaks of pain from the frog. In his lectures, Bird describes many experiments with a similar aim on human sensory organs. In one experiment by Grapengiesser, for instance, electric current is passed through the subject's head from ear to ear, causing a sound to be hallucinated. The ear connected to the positive terminal hears a louder sound than that connected to the negative.

Bird designed his own interrupter circuit for delivering shocks to patients from a voltaic cell through an induction coil. Previously, the interrupter had been a mechanical device requiring the physician to turn a cog wheel or employ an assistant to do so. Bird wished to free his hands to apply the electricity more exactly to the required part of the patient. His interrupter worked automatically by magnetic induction at a reasonably fast rate. The faster the interrupter switches, the more frequently an electric shock is delivered to the patient; the aim is to make the frequency as high as possible.

Bird's interrupter had the medically disadvantageous feature that current was supplied in opposite directions during the make and break operations. Treatment often required the current to be supplied in one specified direction only. Bird produced a unidirectional interrupter using a mechanism now called split rings. This design suffered from the disadvantage that automatic operation was lost and the interrupter had once again to be hand-cranked. Nevertheless, this arrangement remained a cheaper option than electromagnetic generators for some time.

==== Treatments ====
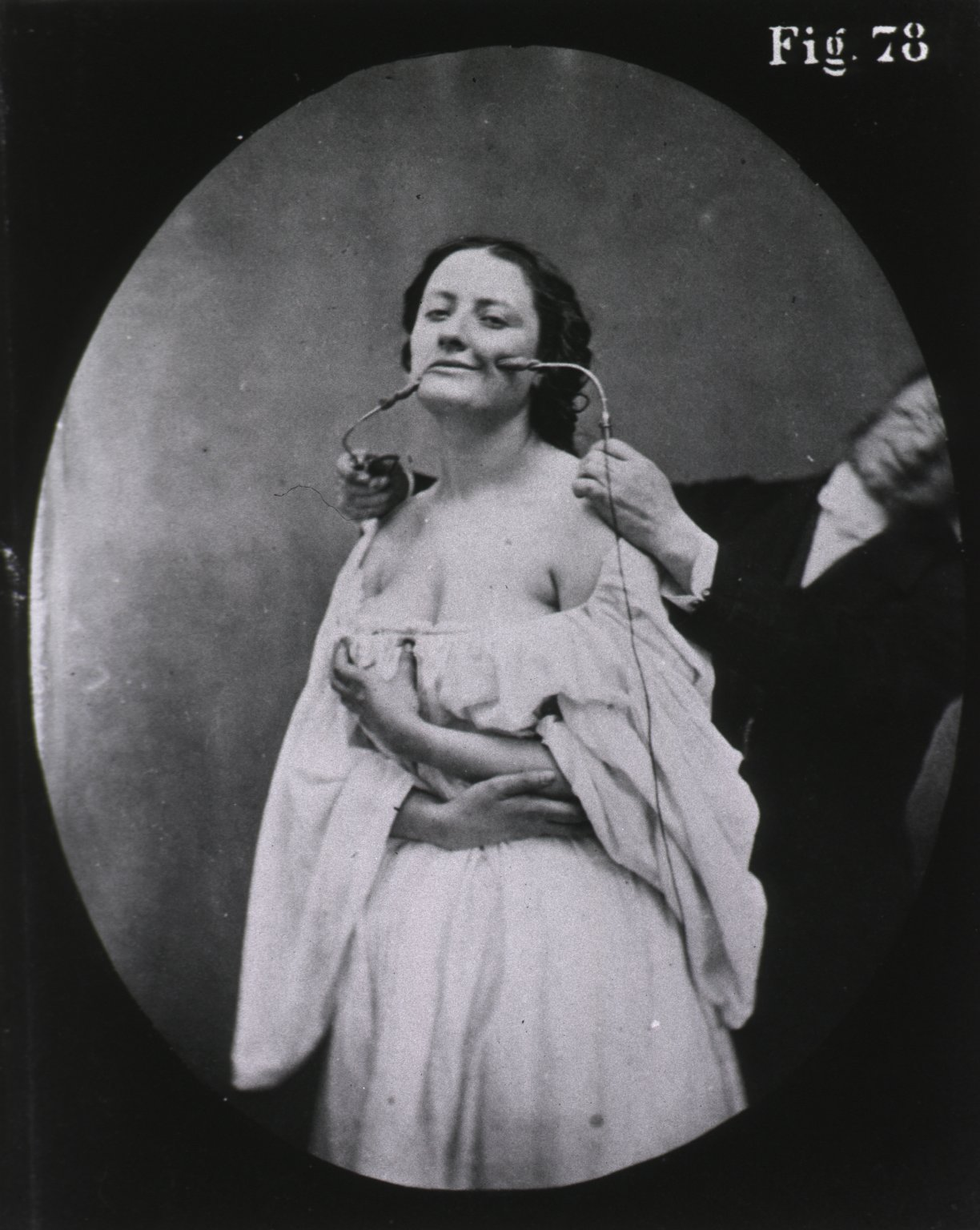
Electrotherapeutic treatment to stimulate facial muscles, Duchenne de Boulogne 1862

Three classes of electrotherapy were in use. One was the electric bath, which consisted of sitting the patient on an insulated stool with glass legs and connecting the patient to one electrode, usually the positive one, of an electrostatic machine. The patient's skin became charged as if he or she were in a "bath of electricity". The second class of treatment could be performed while the patient was in the electric bath. This consisted of bringing a negative electrode close to the patient, usually near the spine, causing sparks to be produced between the electrode and the patient. Electrodes of various shapes were available for different medical purposes and places of application on the body. Treatment was applied in several sessions of around five minutes, often blistering the skin. The third class of treatment was electric shock therapy, in which an electric shock was delivered from a galvanic battery (later electromagnetic generators) via an induction coil to greatly increase the voltage. It was also possible to deliver electric shocks from the charge stored in a Leyden jar, but this was a much weaker shock.

Electric stimulation treatment was used to treat nervous disorders where the nervous system was unable to stimulate a required glandular secretion or muscle activity. It had previously been successfully used to treat some forms of asthma. Bird used his apparatus to treat Sydenham's chorea (St Vitus's dance) and other forms of spasm, some forms of paralysis (although the treatment was of no use where nerves had been physically damaged), opiate overdose (since it kept the patient awake), bringing on menstruation where this had failed (amenorrhoea), and hysteria, a supposed disease of women. Paralysed bladder function in young girls was attributed to the now archaic condition of hysteria. It was treated with the application of a strong electric current between the sacrum and the pubis. Although the treatment worked, in that it caused the bladder to empty, Bird suspected in many cases it did so more through fear and pain than any therapeutic property of electricity.

Electric shock treatment had become fashionable among the public, but often was not favoured by physicians except as a last resort. Its popularity led to many inappropriate treatments, and fraudulent practitioners were widespread. Quack practitioners claimed the treatment as a cure for almost anything, regardless of its effectiveness, and made large sums of money from it. Bird, however, continued to stand by the treatment when properly administered. He convinced an initially sceptical Addison of its merits, and the first publication (in 1837) describing the work of the electrifying unit was authored by Addison, not Bird, although Bird is clearly, and rightly, credited by Addison. Having the paper authored by Addison did a great deal to gain acceptability in a still suspicious medical fraternity. Addison held great authority, whereas Bird at this stage was unknown. Bird's 1841 paper in Guy's Hospital Reports contained an impressively long list of successful case studies. In 1847 he brought the subject fully into the realm of materia medica when he delivered the annual lecture to the Royal College of Physicians on this subject. He spoke out tirelessly against the numerous quack practitioners, in one case exposing railway telegraph operators who were claiming to be medical electricians, although they had no medical training at all. In this way, Bird was largely responsible for the rehabilitation of electrical treatment among medical practitioners. His work, with Addison's support, together with the increasing ease of using the machines as the technology progressed, brought the treatment into wider use in the medical profession.

==== Electric moxa ====
Bird invented the electric moxa in 1843. The name is a reference to the acupuncture technique of moxibustion and was probably influenced by the introduction of electroacupuncture, in which the needles are augmented by an electric current, two decades earlier in France. The electric moxa, however, was not intended for acupuncture. It was used to produce a suppurating sore on the skin of the patient to treat some conditions of inflammation and congestion by the technique of counter-irritation. The sore had previously been created by much more painful means, such as cautery or even burning charcoal. Bird's design was based on a modification of an existing instrument for the local electrical treatment of hemiplegia, and consisted of a silver electrode and a zinc electrode connected by copper wire. Two small blisters were produced on the skin, to which the two electrodes were then connected and held in place for a few days. Electricity was generated by electrolytic action with body fluids. The blister under the silver electrode healed, but the one under the zinc electrode produced the required suppurating sore.

The healing of the blister under the silver electrode was of no importance for a counter-irritation procedure, but it suggested to Bird that the electric moxa might be used for treating obstinate leg ulcers. This was a common complaint among the working classes in Bird's time, and hospitals could not admit the majority of cases for treatment. The moxa improved the situation by enabling those affected to be treated as outpatients. The silver electrode of the moxa was applied to the ulcer to be healed, while the zinc electrode was applied a few inches away to a place where the upper layer of skin had been cut away. The whole apparatus was then bandaged in place as before. The technique was successfully applied by others on Bird's recommendation. Thomas Wells later discovered that it was unnecessary to damage the skin under the zinc plate. He merely moistened the skin with vinegar before applying the zinc electrode.

==== Pulvermacher controversy ====
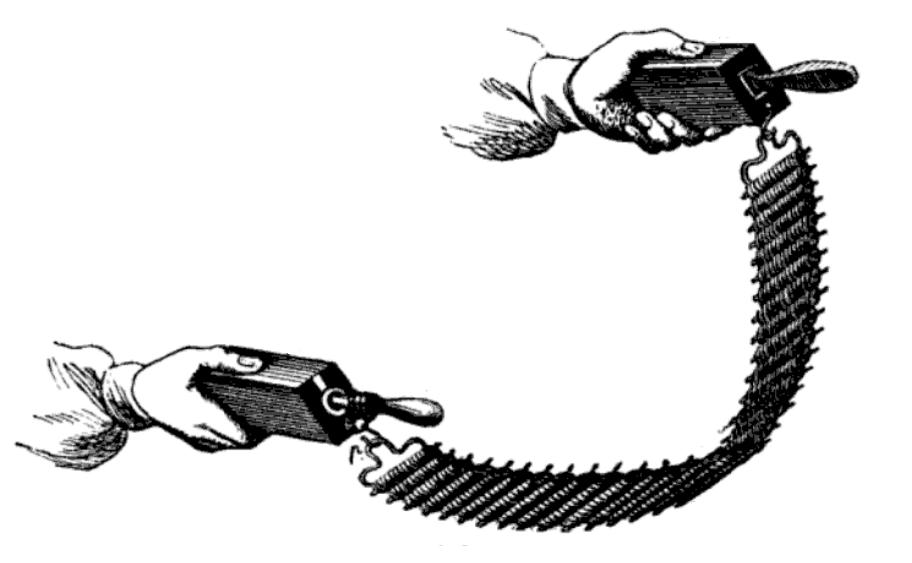
Pulvermacher's chain

There was some controversy over Bird's endorsement of a machine invented by one I. L. Pulvermacher that became known as Pulvermacher's chain. The main market for this device was the very quack practitioners that Bird so detested, but it did work as a battery. Bird was given a sample of this machine in 1851 and was impressed enough to give Pulvermacher a testimonial stating that the machine was a useful source of electricity. Bird thought that it could be used by physicians as a portable device. Electrically, the machine worked like a voltaic pile constructed from wooden dowels, each with a bifilar winding of copper and zinc coils. Each winding was connected to the next dowel by means of metal hooks and eyes, which also provided the electrical connection. The electrolyte was provided by soaking the dowels in vinegar.

Naively, Bird appears to have expected Pulvermacher not to use this testimonial in his advertising. When Pulvermacher's company did so, Bird suffered some criticism for unprofessional behaviour, although it was never suggested that Bird benefited financially, and Bird stated in his defence that the testimonial was only ever intended as a letter of introduction to physicians in Edinburgh. Bird was particularly upset that Pulvermacher's company had used quotations from Bird's publications about the benefits of electrical treatment and misrepresented them as describing benefits of Pulvermacher's product. Bird also criticised Pulvermacher's claim that the chain could be wrapped around an affected limb for medical treatment. Although the flexible nature of its design lent itself to wrapping, Bird said that it would be next to useless in this configuration. According to Bird, the patient's body would provide a conductive path across each cell, thus preventing the device from building up a medically useful voltage at its terminals.

=== Electrochemistry ===
Bird used his position as head of the department of electricity and galvanism to further his research efforts and to aid him in teaching his students. He was interested in electrolysis and repeated the experiments of Antoine César Becquerel, Edmund Davy and others to extract metals in this way. He was particularly interested in the possibility of detecting low levels of heavy metal poisons with this technique, pioneered by Davy. Bird also studied the properties of albumen under electrolysis, finding that the albumen coagulated at the anode because hydrochloric acid was produced there. He corrected an earlier erroneous conclusion by W. T. Brande that high electric current caused coagulation at the cathode also, showing that this was entirely due to fluid flows caused by the strong electric field.

The formation of copper plates on the cathode was noticed in the Daniell cell shortly after its invention in 1836. Bird began a thorough investigation of this phenomenon in the following year. Using solutions of sodium chloride, potassium chloride and ammonium chloride, he succeeded in coating a mercury cathode with sodium, potassium and ammonium respectively, producing amalgams of each of these. Not only chlorides were used; beryllium, aluminium and silicon were obtained from the salts and oxides of these elements.

In 1837, Bird constructed his own version of the Daniell cell. The novel feature of Bird's cell was that the two solutions of copper sulphate and zinc sulphate were in the same vessel, but kept separate by a barrier of plaster of Paris, a common material used in hospitals for setting bone fractures. Being porous, plaster of Paris allows ions to cross the barrier, while preventing the solutions from mixing. This arrangement is an example of a single-cell Daniell cell, and Bird's invention was the first of this kind. Bird's cell was the basis for the later development of the porous pot cell, invented in 1839 by John Dancer.

Bird's experiments with his cell were important for the new discipline of electrometallurgy. An unforeseen result was the deposition of copper on and within the plaster, without any contact with the metal electrodes. On breaking apart the plaster it was found that veins of copper were formed running right through it. So surprising was this result that it was at first disbelieved by electrochemical researchers, including Faraday. Deposition of copper and other metals had previously been noted, but only on metal electrodes. Bird's experiments sometimes get him credit for being the founder of the industrial field of electrometallurgy. In particular, Bird's discovery is the principle behind electrotyping. However, Bird himself never made practical use of this discovery, nor did he carry out any work in metallurgy as such. Some of Bird's contemporaries with interests in electrometallurgy wished to bestow the credit on Bird in order to discredit the commercial claims of their rivals.

Bird thought there was a connection between the functioning of the nervous system and the processes seen in electrolysis at very low, steady currents. He knew that the currents in both were of the same order. To Bird, if such a connection existed, it made electrochemistry an important subject to study for biological reasons.

=== Chemistry ===
==== Arsenic poisoning ====
In 1837 Bird took part in an investigation of the dangers posed by the arsenic content of cheap candles. These were stearin candles with white arsenic added, which made them burn more brightly than ordinary candles. The combination of cheapness and brightness made them popular. The investigation was conducted by the Westminster Medical Society, a student society of Westminster Hospital, and was led by John Snow, later to become famous for his public health investigations. Snow had previously investigated arsenic poisoning when he and several fellow students were taken badly ill after he introduced a new process for preserving cadavers at the suggestion of lecturer Hunter Lane. The new process involved injecting arsenic into the blood vessels of the corpse. Snow found that the arsenic became airborne as a result of chemical reactions with the decomposing corpse, and this was how it was ingested. Bird's part in the candle investigation was to analyse the arsenic content of the candles, which he found to have recently been greatly increased by the manufacturers. Bird also confirmed by experiment that the arsenic became airborne when the candles were burnt. The investigators exposed various species of animal and bird to the candles in controlled conditions. The animals all survived, but the birds died. Bird investigated the bird deaths and analysed the bodies, finding small amounts of arsenic. No arsenic was found on the feathers, however, indicating that poisoning was not caused by breathing airborne arsenic, since arsenic in the air would be expected to adhere to the feathers. Bird found that large amounts of arsenic were in the birds' drinking water, indicating that this was the route taken by the poison.

==== Carbon monoxide poisoning ====
Although it had been known how to prepare carbon monoxide since 1776, it was not at first recognised that carbon monoxide poisoning was the mechanism of death and injury from stoves burning carbonaceous fuels. A coroner's inquest into the death in 1838 of James Trickey, a nightwatchman who had spent all night by a new type of charcoal burning stove in St Michael, Cornhill, concluded that the poison involved was carbonic acid (that is, carbon dioxide) rather than carbon monoxide. Both Bird and Snow gave evidence to the inquest supporting poisoning by carbonic acid. Bird himself started to suffer ill effects while collecting air samples from the floor near the stove. However, the makers of the stove, Harper and Joyce, produced a string of their own expert witnesses, who convinced the jury to decide that death was caused by apoplexy, and that "impure air" was only a contributing factor. Among the unscientific claims made at the inquest by Harper and Joyce were that carbonic gas would rise to the ceiling (in fact it is heavier than air and, according to Bird, would lie in a layer close to the floor, just where the sleeping Trickey's head would rest) and that "deleterious vapour" from the coffins in the vaults had risen into the church. After the inquest Joyce threatened to sue a journal which continued to criticise the stove for its lack of ventilation. In a subsequent clarification, Bird made it clear that any stove burning carbonaceous fuel was dangerous if it did not have a chimney or other means of ventilation. In fact, Trickey had only been placed in the church in the first place at the suggestion of Harper, who was expecting him to give favourable reports of the new stove's performance.

Bird read a paper to the Senior Physical Society in 1839, reporting on tests he conducted of the effects on sparrows of poisoning by carbonaceous fumes. This paper was of some importance and resulted in Bird giving his views to the British Association in the same year. (He acted as a secretary to the chemical section of the British Association in Birmingham.) Bird also presented the paper at the Westminster Medical School, where Snow took a special interest in it. Until then, Snow and many others had believed that carbonic acid acted merely by excluding oxygen. The experiments of Bird and others convinced him that it was harmful in its own right, but he still did not subscribe to Bird's view that it was an active poison. Also in 1839, Bird published a comprehensive paper in Guy's Hospital Reports, complete with many case histories, in which he documents the state of knowledge. He realised that at least some cases of poisoning from stoves were due not to carbonic acid, but to some other agent, although he still had not identified it as carbon monoxide.

==== Urology ====
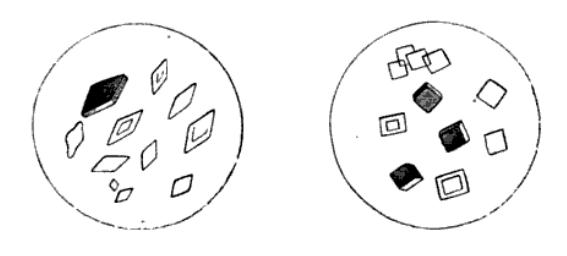
Uric acid crystals drawn by Bird. On the left are crystals formed in normal urine; on the right, crystals from a patient who had kidney stones.

Bird did a great deal of research in urology, including the chemistry of both urine and kidney stones, and soon became a recognised expert. This work occupied a large proportion of his effort, and his writings on urinary sediments and kidney stones were the most advanced at the time. His work followed on from, and was much influenced by, that of Alexander Marcet and William Prout. Marcet was also a physician at Guy's; Prout held no position at Guy's, but was connected with the hospital and well known there. For instance, when Marcet discovered a new constituent of kidney stones, xanthic oxide, he sent it to Prout for analysis. Prout discovered a new substance himself in 1822, a constituent of urine which he named melanic acid, because it turned black on contact with air.

Bird studied and categorised the collection of stones at Guy's, concentrating particularly on the crystal structures of the nuclei, since stone formation followed once there was a nucleus on which to form. He considered the chemistry of the nuclei to be the most important aspect of stone formation. Bird identified many species of stone, classified by the chemistry of the nucleus, but decided that they all fell within two overall groups: organic stones caused by a malfunctioning bodily process, and excessive inorganic salts causing sediment on which the stone could nucleate. In 1842, Bird became the first to describe oxaluria, sometimes called Bird's disease, which is sometimes caused by an excess of oxalate of lime in the urine. This is the most common type of kidney stone. The most common cause of kidney stones is now known to be an excess of calcium in the urine, not oxalate; though calcium oxalate stones are the most common type, it is the excess of calcium that is the most common cause of their formation. Some people do have an excess of oxalate in their urine and form calcium oxalate stones because of that; this can be related to diet, hereditary factors or intestinal diseases. Today we know the most common type of kidney stones are calcium oxalate (about 74%), calcium phosphate, (about 20%), and uric acid (about 4% overall but more common in obese people and those with gout). In his great work Urinary Deposits, Bird devotes much space to the identification of chemicals in urine by microscopic examination of the appearance of crystals in it. He shows how the appearance of crystals of the same chemical can vary greatly under differing conditions, and especially how the appearance changes with disease. Urinary Deposits became a standard text on the subject; there were five editions between 1844 and 1857. In the fourth edition Bird added a recommendation to wash out the bladder in cases of alkaline urine, after an experiment by Snow showed that stale urine became alkaline when fresh urine was slowly dripped into it. Bird knew that alkaline urine encouraged phosphate precipitation and the consequent encrustation and stone formation. The last edition of Urinary Deposits was updated after Bird's death by Edmund Lloyd Birkett.

Bird was the first to recognise that certain forms of urinary casts are an indication of Bright's disease. Casts were first discovered by Henry Bence Jones. They are microscopic cylinders of Tamm-Horsfall protein that have been precipitated in the kidneys and then released into the urine; we know now these casts are normal findings unless they contain cells within them; these cellular casts indicating an abnormality in the kidneys.

==== Vitalism ====
A prevalent idea in the 18th and early 19th centuries was that illness was a result of the condition of the whole body. The environment and the activity of the patient thus played a large part in any treatment. The epitome of this kind of thinking was the concept of the vital force, which was supposed to govern the chemical processes within the body. This theory held that organic compounds could only be formed within living organisms, where the vital force could come into play. This belief had been known to be false ever since Friedrich Wöhler succeeded in synthesising urea from inorganic precursors in 1828. Nevertheless, the vital force continued to be invoked to explain organic chemistry in Bird's time. Sometime in the middle of the 19th century, a new way of thinking started to take shape, especially among younger physicians, fuelled by rapid advances in the understanding of chemistry. For the first time, it became possible to identify specific chemical reactions with specific organs of the body, and to trace their effects through the various functional relations of the organs and the exchanges between them.

Among these younger radicals were Bird and Snow; among the old school was William Addison (a different person from Bird's superior at Guy's). Addison disliked the modern reliance on laboratory and theoretical results favoured by the new generation, and challenged Richard Bright (who gave his name to Bright's disease) when Bright suggested that the source of the problem in oedema was the kidneys. Addison preferred to believe that the condition was caused by intemperance or some other external factor, and that since the whole body had been disrupted, it could not be localised to a specific organ. Addison further challenged Bright's student, Snow, when in 1839 Snow suggested from case studies and laboratory analysis that oedema was associated with an increase in albumin in the blood. Addison dismissed this as a mere epiphenomenon. Bird disagreed with Snow's proposed treatment, but his arguments clearly show him to be on the radical side of the debate, and he completely avoided whole-body arguments. Snow had found that the proportion of urea in the urine of his patients was low and concluded from this that urea was accumulating in the blood, and therefore proposed bloodletting to counter this. Bird disputed that increased urea in the blood was the cause of kidney disease and doubted the effectiveness of this treatment, citing the results of François Magendie, who had injected urea into the blood, apparently with no ill effects. It is not clear whether Bird accepted Snow's reasoning that urea must be accumulating, or whether he merely adopted it for the sake of argument; while a student in 1833, he had disputed this very point with another of Bright's students, George Rees.

Justus von Liebig is another important figure in the development of the new thinking, although his position is ambiguous. He explained chemical processes in the body in terms of addition and subtraction of simple molecules from a larger organic molecule, a concept that Bird followed in his own work but even the materialistic Liebig continued to invoke the vital force for processes inside living animal bodies. This seems to have been based on a belief that the entire living animal is required for these chemical processes to take place. Bird helped to dispel this kind of thinking by showing that specific chemistry is related to specific organs in the body rather than to the whole animal. He challenged some of Liebig's conclusions concerning animal chemistry. For example, Liebig had predicted that the ratio of uric acid to urea would depend on the level of activity of a species or individual; Bird showed this to be false. Bird also felt that it was not enough simply to count atoms as Liebig did, but that an explanation was also required as to why the atoms recombined in one particular way rather than any other. He made some attempts to provide this explanation by invoking the electric force, rather than the vital force, based on his own experiments in electrolysis.

== Flexible stethoscope ==
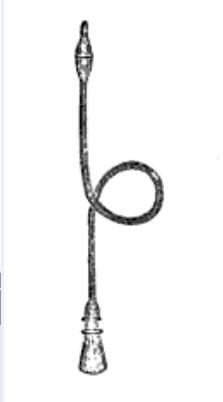
Bird's flexible stethoscope

Bird designed and used a flexible tube stethoscope in June 1840, and in the same year he published the first description of such an instrument. In his paper he mentions an instrument already in use by other physicians (Drs. Clendinning and Stroud), which he describes as the "snake ear trumpet". He thought this instrument had some severe technical faults; in particular, its great length led to poor performance. The form of Bird's invention is similar to the modern stethoscope, except that it has only one earpiece. An ill-tempered exchange of letters occurred in the London Medical Gazette between another physician, John Burne, and Bird. Burne claimed that he also used the same instrument as Clendinning and Stroud and was offended that Bird had not mentioned him in his paper. Burne, who worked at the Westminster Hospital, pointed with suspicion to the fact that Bird's brother Frederic also worked there. In a reply full of anger and sarcasm, Bird pointed out that in his original paper he had already made clear that he claimed no credit for the earlier instrument. Bird found the flexible stethoscope convenient as it avoided uncomfortably leaning over patients (as would be required by a rigid stethoscope) and the earpiece could be passed to other doctors and students to listen. It was particularly useful for Bird, with his severe rheumatism, as he could apply the stethoscope to the patient from a seated position.

== Elements of Natural Philosophy ==
When Bird took up lecturing on science at Guy's, he could not find a textbook suitable for his medical students. He needed a book that went into some detail of physics and chemistry, but which medical students would not find overwhelmingly mathematical. Bird reluctantly undertook to write such a book himself, based on his 1837–1838 lectures, and the result was Elements of Natural Philosophy, first published in 1839. It proved to be spectacularly popular, even beyond its intended audience of medical students, and went through six editions. Reprints were still being produced more than 30 years later in 1868. The fourth edition was edited by Charles Brooke, a friend of Bird's, after the latter's death. Brooke made good many of Bird's mathematical omissions. Brooke edited further editions and, in the sixth edition of 1867, thoroughly updated it.

The book was well received and was praised by reviewers for its clarity. The Literary Gazette, for instance, thought that it "teaches us the elements of the entire circle of natural philosophy in the clearest and most perspicuous manner". The reviewer recommended it as suitable not just for students and not just for the young, saying that it "ought to be in the hands of every individual who desires to taste the pleasures of divine philosophy, and obtain a competent knowledge of that creation in which they live".

Medical journals, on the other hand, were more restrained in their praise. The Provincial Medical and Surgical, for instance, in its review of the second edition, thought that it was "a good and concise elementary treatise ... presenting in a readable and intelligible form, a great mass of information not to be found in any other single treatise". But the Provincial had a few technical quibbles, among which was the complaint that there was no description of the construction of a stethoscope. The Provincial reviewer thought that the book was particularly suitable for students who had no previous instruction in physics. The sections on magnetism, electricity and light were particularly recommended.

In their review of the 6th edition, Popular Science Review noted that the author was now named as Brooke and observed that he had now made the book his own. The reviewers looked back with nostalgia to the book they knew as "the Golding Bird" when they were students. They note with approval the many newly included descriptions of the latest technology, such as the dynamos of Henry Wilde and Werner von Siemens, and the spectroscope of Browning.

The scope of the book was wide-ranging, covering much of the physics then known. The 1839 first edition included statics, dynamics, gravitation, mechanics, hydrostatics, pneumatics, hydrodynamics, acoustics, magnetism, electricity, atmospheric electricity, electrodynamics, thermoelectricity, bioelectricity, light, optics, and polarised light. In the 1843 second edition Bird expanded the material on electrolysis into its own chapter, reworked the polarised light material, added two chapters on "thermotics" (thermodynamics – a major omission from the first edition), and a chapter on the new technology of photography. Later editions also included a chapter on electric telegraphy. Brooke was still expanding the book for the sixth and final edition. New material included the magnetic properties of iron in ships and spectrum analysis.

== Works ==
- Elements of Natural Philosophy; being an experimental introduction to the study of the physical sciences, London: John Churchill, 1839 OCLC 78948792.
- Lectures on Electricity and Galvanism, in their physiological and therapeutical relations, delivered at the Royal College of Physicians in March 1849, London: Wilson & Ogilvy, 1849 OCLC 664909225.
- Lectures on the Influence of Researches in Organic Chemistry on Therapeutics, especially in relation to the depuration of the blood, delivered at the Royal College of Physicians, London: Wilson & Ogilvy, 1848 OCLC 51554760.
- Urinary Deposits, their diagnosis, pathology and therapeutical indications, London: John Churchill, 1844 OCLC 670415670.

== Journal articles ==
- Report of the Seventh Meeting of the British Society for the Advancement of Science, vol. 6 (1837), p. 45, London: J. Murray, 1838. (Bird's first publication of his modification of the Daniell cell)
- "Observations on induced electric currents, with a description of a magnetic contact-breaker", Philosophical Magazine, vol. 12, no. 71, pp. 18–22, January 1838.
- "Observations on the existence of saline combinations in an organized state, in vegetable matter", The Magazine of Natural History, vol. 2, pp. 74–78, February 1838.
- "Observations on indirect chemical analysis", Philosophical Magazine, vol. 12, no. 74, pp. 229–232, March 1838.
- "Experimental researches on the nature and properties of albumen", Philosophical Magazine, vol. 12, no. 79, pp. 15–22, July 1838.
- "Observations on some peculiar properties acquired by plates of platina, which have been used as electrodes of a voltaic battery", Philosophical Magazine, vol. 12, no. 83, pp. 379–386, November 1838.
- "Mucous and purulent secretions", Guy's Hospital Reports, vol. 3, pp. 35–59, 1838.
- "Notice respecting the artificial formation of a basic chloride of copper by voltaic influence", Report of the Eighth Meeting of the British Society for the Advancement of Science, vol. 7 (1838), pp. 56–57, London: J. Murray, 1839.
- "Notice respecting the deposition of metallic copper from is solutions by slow voltaic action at a point equidistant from the metallic surfaces", Report of the Eighth Meeting of the British Society for the Advancement of Science, vol. 7 (1838), pp. 57–59, London: J. Murray, 1839.
- "Observations on some of the products of nitric acid on alcohol", Philosophical Magazine, 1838. (Summarised in Report of the Eighth Meeting of the British Society for the Advancement of Science, vol. 7, pp. 55–56, London: J. Murray, 1839.)
- "Observation on poisoning by the vapours of burning charcoal and coals", Guy's Hospital Reports, vol. 4, pp. 75–105, 1839.
- "Advantages presented by the employment of a stethoscope with a flexible tube", London Medical Gazette, vol. 1, pp. 440–412, 11 December 1840.
- "Report on the value of electricity, as a remedial agent in the treatment of diseases", Guy's Hospital Reports, vol. 6, pp. 84–120, 1841.
- "Fatty urine", The Medical Times, vol. 9, no. 223, p. 175, 30 December 1843.
- "Treatment of uric acid gravel by phosphate of soda", Medical Gazette, p. 689, 23 August 1844.
- "Infantile syphilis", Guy's Hospital Reports, p. 130, April 1845.
- "Treatment of disease by moist air", Medical Gazette, p. 999, 3 October 1845.
- "The nature of the green alvine evacuations of children", The Medical Times, vol. 13, no. 317, pp. 74–75, 18 October 1845.
- "Treatment of disease by moist air", The Medical Times, vol. 13, no. 325, p. 228, 13 December 1845.
- "Diseases of children", Guy's Hospital Reports, series 2, vol. 3, pp. 108–141, 1845.
- "Acetate of lead in diarrhoea", The Medical Times, vol. 13, no. 337, p. 465, 14 March 1846.
- "Case of excessive secretion of the ammonio-magnesium phosphate by the kidneys, with long continued vomiting", The Medical Times, vol. 13, no. 340, pp. 522–523, 4 April 1846.
- "Case of internal strangulation of intestine relieved by operation", from Transactions of the Royal Medico-Chirurgical Society, with John Hilton, London:Richard Kinder, 1847.

Bird was frequently mentioned in the transactions of the Medical Society of London. Some examples are:

- "Transactions of the Medical Society of London, Oct 16", The Medical Times, vol. 9, no. 213, pp. 39–40, 21 October 1843. Report on the poisoning of a watch enameller by arsenic vapour.
- "Transactions of the Medical Society of London, Jan 15 1844", The Medical Times, vol. 9, no. 227, pp. 271–274, 27 January 1844. Report on a case of a child with inflammatory croup.

== Bibliography ==
- Balfour, John Hutton, Biographical Sketch of the late Dr. Golding Bird, Edinburgh: Thomas Constable and Co., 1855 OCLC 14530995.
- Brock, William H., Justus Von Liebig: The Chemical Gatekeeper, Cambridge: Cambridge University Press, 2002 ISBN 0-521-52473-3.
- Brooke, Charles; Bird, Golding, Elements of Natural Philosophy, London: John Churchill and Sons 1867 OCLC 558148825.
- Carleton, Bukk G., Uropoietic Diseases, New York: Boericke & Runyon, 1900 OCLC 14806546.
- Chapman, Henry Thomas, The Treatment of Obstinate Ulcers and Cutaneous Eruptions on the Leg, Without Confinement, London: John Churchill, 1859 OCLC 8344248.
- Coley, N. G., "The collateral sciences in the work of Golding Bird (1814–1854)", Medical History, vol. 13, iss. 4, pp. 363–376, October 1969.
- Foregger, Richard, "John Snow's early research on carbon dioxide", Anesthesiology, vol. 21, iss. 1, pp. 20–25, January/February 1960.
- Lardner, Dionysius, Electricity, Magnetism, and Acoustics, London: Spottiswoode & Co. 1856 OCLC 23820736.
- Lee, H. S. J., Dates in Urology, New York: Parthenon Pub. Group, 2000 ISBN 1-85070-496-1.
- Morus, Iwan Rhys, Frankenstein's Children: Electricity, Exhibition, and Experiment in Early-nineteenth-century London, Princeton: Princeton University Press, 1998 ISBN 0-691-05952-7.
- Payne, J. F.; McConnell, Anita, "Bird, Golding (1814–1854)", Oxford Dictionary of National Biography, Oxford University Press, 2004; online edition, May 2008, accessed 6 March 2011 (subscription required).
- Pfeiffer, Carl J., The Art and Practice of Western Medicine in the Early Nineteenth Century, Jefferson, N. C.: McFarland & Co., 1985 ISBN 0-89950-167-2.
- Rosenfeld, Louis, Four Centuries of Clinical Chemistry, Amsterdam: Gordon & Breach Science, 1999 ISBN 90-5699-645-2.
- Rosenfeld, Louis, "The Chemical Work of Alexander and Jane Marcet", Clinical Chemistry, vol. 47, pp. 784–792, 2001, American Association for Clinical Chemistry.
- Rosenfeld, Louis, "Justus Liebig and Animal Chemistry", Clinical Chemistry, vol. 49, pp. 1696–1707, 2003.
- Schmidt, Jacob Edward, Medical Discoveries: Who and When, Springfield: Thomas, 1959 OCLC 11030573.
- Simpson, Brian A., Electrical Stimulation and the Relief of Pain, Elsevier Health Sciences, 2003 ISBN 0-444-51258-6.
- Smellie, James, A Few Observations on the Influences of Electro-galvanism in the Cure of Chronic Rheumatism, Certain Forms of Paralysis, Nervous, and other Complaints, London: William Horsell and R Pemberton Junior, 1858 OCLC 614815011.
- Steel, Robert, "Dr. Golding Bird, the physician", Doing Good, or, the Christian in Walks of Usefulness, pp. 206–214, Philadelphia: Perkinpine and Higgins, 1859.
- Steventon, Glyn B.; Mitchell, Steve C., Molecules of Death, London: Imperial College Press, 2007 ISBN 1-86094-814-6.
- Talbott, John Harold, A Biographical History of Medicine, New York: Grune & Stratton, 1970 OCLC 113889.
- Vinten-Johansen, Peter, Cholera, Chloroform, and the Science of Medicine: a Life of John Snow, Oxford: Oxford University Press, 2003 ISBN 0-19-513544-X.
- Watt, Alexander; Philip, Arnold, Electroplating and Electrorefining of Metals, Palm Springs: Watchmaker Publishing, 2005 ISBN 1-929148-45-3 (originally published 1889).
- Wermuth, Camille Georges, The Practice of Medicinal Chemistry, Burlington, MA: Academic Press, 2008 ISBN 0-12-374194-7.
- Wilks, Samuel, "Evolution of the stethoscope", Popular Science, vol. 22, no. 28, pp. 488–491, February 1883 ISSN 0161-7370.
- Wilks, Samuel; Bettany, G. T., "Dr. Golding Bird", A Biographical History of Guy's Hospital, London: Ward, Lock, Bowden & Co. 1892 OCLC 14809726.
- Winslow, Octavius, Life in Jesus: A Memoir of Mrs. Mary Winslow, New York: Robert Carter and Brothers, 1860 OCLC 326048674.
