= Smarn Muntarbhorn =

Thai-born cardiac surgeon and Thailand's first heart surgeon

Smarn Muntarbhorn สมาน มันตาภรณ์
- Born: November 20, 1914; Surathani, Thailand
- Died: 2001

Smarn Muntarbhorn, MRCS 1941, FRCS 1945, MB BS London 1941, DTM&H Liverpool 1941, FACCP 1951 (20 November 1914 - 2001) was a Thai-born cardiac surgeon and Thailand's first heart surgeon. He is renowned as the father of cardiac surgery in Thailand and was the first Thai surgeon to become a Fellow of The Royal College of Surgeons of England. He was awarded a royal honorary doctorate by the King of Thailand.

Smarn matriculated from Suan Kularb College in Bangkok and was then awarded the prestigious King's Scholarship from Thailand to study abroad in England. At nearly 19 years old Smarn moved to England where he attended Manchester Grammar School and then went to Guy's Hospital to study medicine. Whilst a student at Guy's Hospital, Smarn won a scholarship in confined science and the Golding-Bird gold medal and prize in 1940.

He married Niramol Dhonavanik in 1950 and they had two sons, Kanit Muntarbhorn (who qualified at Guy's) and Vitit Muntarbhorn, and one daughter, Sirabhorn Muntarbhorn. Smarn had one grandchild, Tuck Muntarbhorn, son of Kanit Muntarbhorn and Busardi Muntarbhorn.
