= Purpurin =

Purpurin or purpurine may refer to:

- 1,2,4-Trihydroxyanthraquinone, a natural red/yellow dye found in the madder plant
- Purpurin (protein), a protein, belonging to the lipocalin family
- Purpurin (glass), a red or reddish-brown ancient type of glass
- Purpurine, an earlier, but still occasionally seen, name for uroerythrin, the pink/red precipitate from urine
