= Electric bath (electrotherapy) =

19th-century medical treatment

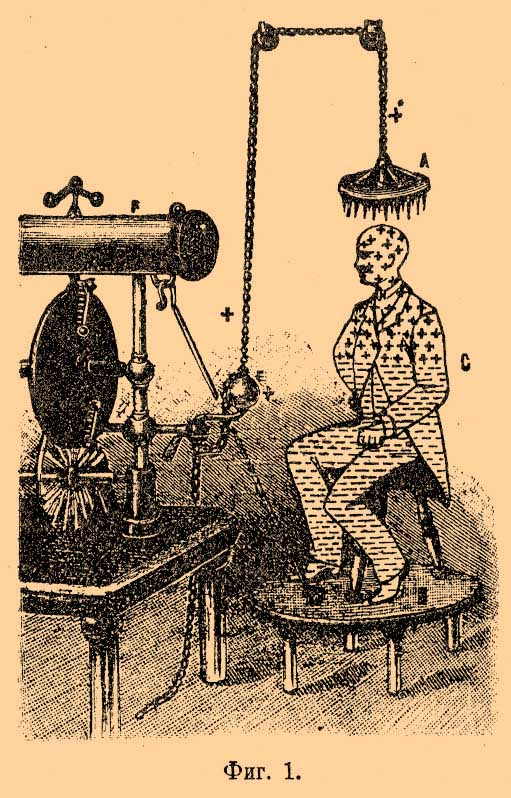
High voltage electric bath c. 1890s–1900s

An electric bath is a 19th-century medical treatment in which high-voltage electrical apparatus was used for electrifying patients by causing an electric charge to build up on their bodies. In the US this process was known as Franklinization after Benjamin Franklin. The process became widely known after Franklin described it in the mid-18th century, but after that it was mostly practiced by quacks. Golding Bird brought it into the mainstream at Guy's Hospital in the mid-19th century and it fell into disuse in the early 20th century.

== Description ==
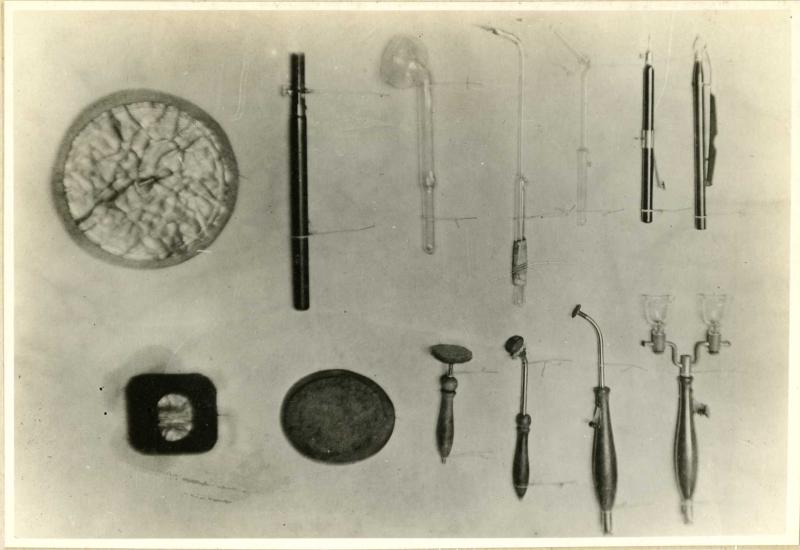
Assorted electrotherapy electrodes c. 1918–1920s

The source of electricity for an electric bath was usually a frictional electrical machine. The patient was seated on a wooden stool, and both the patient and the stool insulated from ground by a platform on glass legs or some other insulator. In some arrangements, the patient was lying down rather than seated. The patient was then charged with static electricity either by direct connection to one electrode of the generator (usually the positive), or else through electrostatic induction by holding a large electrode close to the patient's body. The electric tension applied was around 30–50 kV. Treatment could take several hours. Following charging the patient was "bathed" in electricity, hence the name of the procedure. This can be observed in a darkened room as a luminous discharge around the patient, especially at the hair and extremeties.

The electric bath treatment was painless, but it caused the patient to warm and sweat, and the heart rate to increase. It also caused the hair to stand on end. The electric bath could form a treatment in itself. It could also be the first stage in further treatment. A common procedure was to draw sparks from the patient after charging, especially from the spine.

== History ==
Electricity had been in use for medical treatment since the mid-18th century. However, this was mainly at the hands of quacks and charlatans, often promoting the treatment as a universal panacea. One notorious fringe practitioner using the electric bath was James Graham. It was brought into the mainstream by Golding Bird at Guy's Hospital who ran the "electrifying room" there from 1836. This was not the first time electricity had been used as a treatment in a hospital, but Bird was the first to study its efficacy with scientific rigour. According to Thomas Addison, past hospital use had been "vague and indiscriminate". Bird was well aware of the need to overcome this bad reputation and convince his colleagues. In a series of Guy's Hospital Reports, Bird identified specific treatments for specific conditions based on case studies. He was quick to highlight conditions that could not be treated so that his work was distinguished from the charlatans. Nevertheless, electrotherapy was usually considered a treatment of last resort when all else had failed.

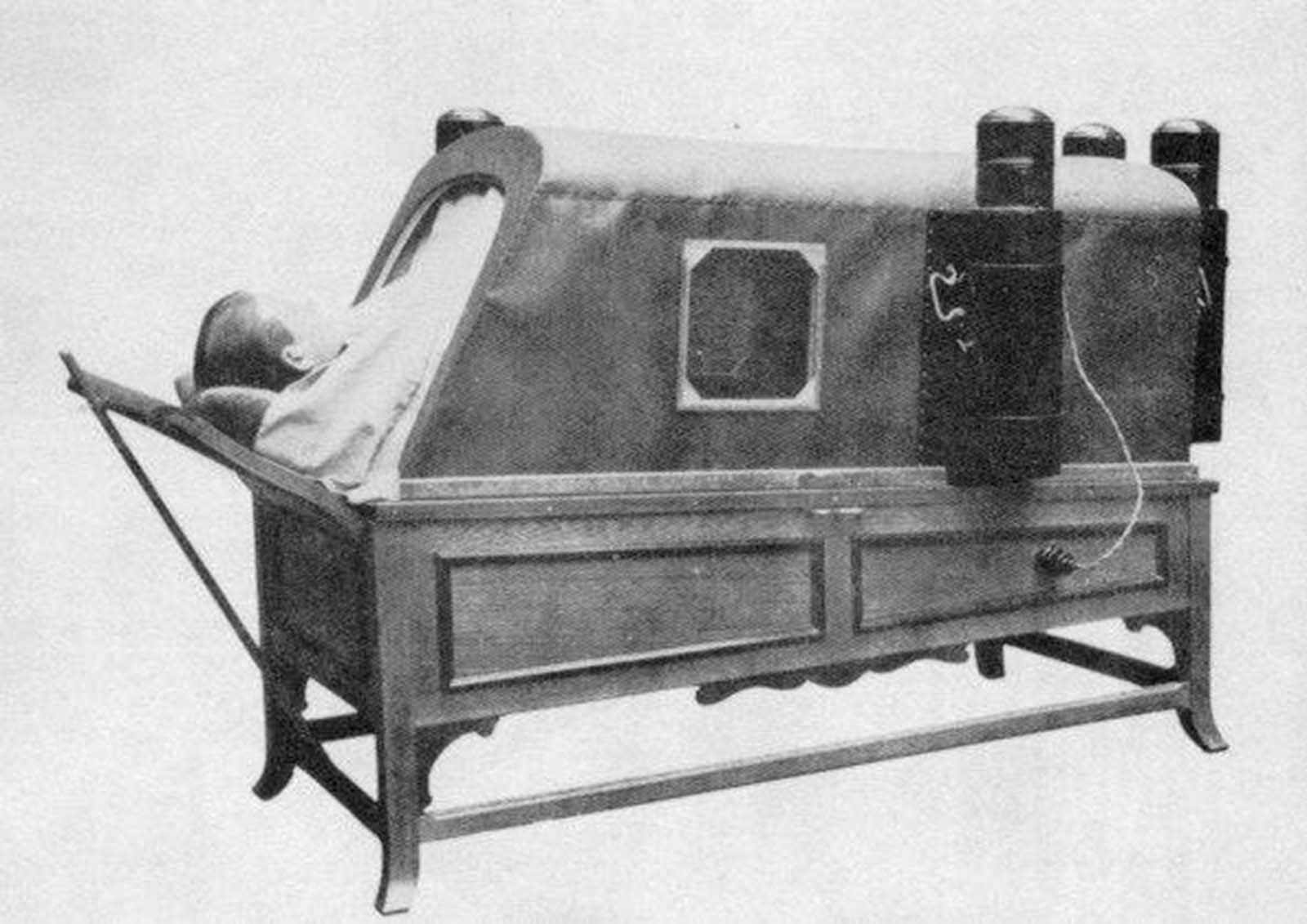
The electric bath in the Titanic's Victorian-style Turkish baths, next to the swimming pool on F deck. (1912 photo)

Bird's most common use of the electric bath was to use the electric charge on the patient to draw off sparks by placing another electrode near the point of treatment. He used this method on the spine of chorea sufferers with some success. Another condition for which Bird used this treatment was wrist drop caused by lead poisoning. Bird found that there were some conditions for which this treatment did not work, mostly conditions where the brain or nervous system had been damaged such as epilepsy.

The process of charging up a patient with static electricity was called Franklinization after Benjamin Franklin briefly experimented in this field. He attempted to treat a number of paralytics, first with electric shocks, and then with static charging, but without much success. He described these procedures in a letter of 1757. Franklinization could also be applied locally to a wound or specific patch of skin with a hand-held array of needle electrodes. The intention was often to generate a "static breeze", a wind of ionized air over the skin. Alternatively, the intention could be to breathe in the ionized air as a form of ozone therapy.

Electric bath apparatus for medical use were still for sale as late as 1908.

== Bibliography ==
- Bird, Golding (1841). "Report on the value of electricity, as a remedial agent in the treatment of diseases". Guy's Hospital Reports. Vol. 6. Guy's Hospital. pp. 84–120.
- Chalovich, Joseph (January 23, 2012). "Franklinization: Early Therapeutic Use of Static Electricity". The ScholarShip, East Carolina University.
- Coley, N. G. (October 1969). "The collateral sciences in the work of Golding Bird (1814–1854)". Medical History. 13 (4): 363–376. doi:10.1017/S0025727300014794. ISSN 2048-8343. PMC 1033981. PMID 4899816.
- Knight, James (1874). Orthopædia. New York: GP Putnam's Sons. British Library 018207409
- Morus, Iwan Rhys (1998). Frankenstein's Children: Electricity, Exhibition, and Experiment in Early-nineteenth-century London. Princeton University Press. ISBN 978-0-691-05952-5.
- Pinchuk, LS; Nikolaev, VI; Tsetkova, EA; Goldade, VA (2005-12-02). Tribology and Biophysics of Artificial Joints. Elsevier. ISBN 978-0-08-045808-3.
- Schiffer, Michael Brian (2001). "The explanation of long-term technological change". Anthropological Perspectives on Technology. UNM Press. ISBN 978-0-8263-2369-9.
- Schiffer, Michael Brian (2006-03-02). Draw the Lightning Down: Benjamin Franklin and Electrical Technology in the Age of Enlightenment. University of California Press. ISBN 978-0-520-24829-8.
