= Nathaniel Burnett Ham =

Australian doctor (1865–1954)

Nathaniel Burnett Ham (1865–1954), also known as Bertie Ham, was an Australian physician. He studied at Guy's in London and became a member of the Royal College of Surgeons and a licentiate of the Royal College of Physicians in 1896. He obtained an MD from the Université libre de Bruxelles in 1900. In Australia he became Queensland's first commissioner of public health in 1901, in which role he did important work in the study of bubonic plague and its relationship with the flea. His findings were published in his Report on Plague in Queensland, 1900-07. He returned to England in 1913 and after service in World War I continued his career in England for the remainder of his life.
