= Theodora Greene =

American chemist

Theodora Whatmough Greene
- Born: 1931; Boston
- Died: 2005 (aged 73–74)
- Spouse: Frederick Greene
- Children: 4
- Scientific career
- Doctoral advisor: EJ Corey

Theodora Whatmough Greene (19 November 1931 – 14 July 2005) was a chemist, most well known for authoring the book Protective Groups in Organic Synthesis, which summarises the use of protecting groups in organic synthesis.

== Early life and education ==
Theodora Whatmough was born in Boston in 1931. She completed a bachelor's degree at Radcliffe College and followed by a master's degree at Harvard. In 1953, she married fellow chemist Frederick Greene, with whom she had four children.

== Protective Groups in Organic Synthesis ==
In 1975, at the age of 44, Greene returned to science to undertake a PhD under the supervision of EJ Corey. She received her PhD on 5 June 1980 whereupon she adapted her thesis into a book, Protective Groups in Organic Synthesis (John Wiley & Sons), published in 1981 and co-authored with Peter G. M. Wuts. Protective Groups, now in its fifth edition, has found its place as a common reference textbook in organic chemistry labs, where it is used as a guide for the selection of protecting groups.
