= Tuck Muntarbhorn =

Tuck Muntarbhorn ทัก มันตาภรณ์
- Born: January 1994 (age 32); Bangkok, Thailand

Tuck Muntarbhorn (Thai: ทัก มันตาภรณ์; born January 1994 in Bangkok, Thailand) is a Thai artist, curator, contemporary art collector and entrepreneur based in London and Bangkok. Muntarbhorn is Thailand's first contemporary art collector to produce and curate an art exhibition in the UK.

He co-founded the international fashion brand Busardi in 2009 with the intention of bridging the exclusivity of haute couture with the accessibility of prêt-à-porter (as 'semi-couture'). In 2015, it became the first Thai label to exhibit collections at the Paris Fashion Week. Within the field of haute couture, Muntarbhorn's creations have been characterized among those that reflect designers' own personalities.

Muntarbhorn views creativity as a spiritual practice: an awareness of thought, feeling, sensation, perception and intention; creating photography and sculpture to unite Eastern and Western symbols of spirituality to promote humanitarianism.
