= Busardi =

Thai semi-couture fashion brand

- Industry: Fashion
- Founded: 2009
- Founder: Busardi Muntarbhorn; Tuck Muntarbhorn
- Headquarters: Bangkok, Thailand

Busardi is a Thai semi-couture fashion brand founded in 2009 by Busardi Muntarbhorn and her son, Tuck Muntarbhorn. Busardi is Thailand’s first brand to show at Paris Haute Couture Week.

The brand stems from a familial tradition that can be traced back to Yoswadee Boon-Long, creator of Yoswadee, a long-standing fashion house that dressed the royal family, glamorous Thai aristocrats, and women in the government during the 1950s and 1960s.

In January 2015, Busardi made its debut in Paris haute couture with its Spring-Summer 2015 collection.

The brand is known for its use of guipure lace and fine Thai craftsmanship, and for romantic designs that fall between haute couture and ready-to-wear clothing.
