= Xue-Min Cheng =

Medicinal chemist

- Education: Peking University; University of Pittsburgh
- Scientific career
- Thesis: (1987)
- Doctoral advisor: Alan P. Kozikowski
- Other academic advisors: E. J. Corey

Xue-Min Cheng is a medicinal chemist, author and pharmaceutical executive best known as the co-author of The Logic of Chemical Synthesis, which formalized retrosynthesis. The concept for this Elias J. Corey won the 1990 Nobel Prize in Chemistry.

== Education and Postdoctoral research ==
Cheng earned her BS in chemistry from Peking University, and a doctoral degree in synthetic chemistry from Alan Kozikowski at the University of Pittsburgh. Her work studied applications of nitrile oxides, for example cycloadditions to form C-glycosides, or utilization of nitrile oxides as precursors to functionalized heterocycles. While a postdoctoral scholar at Harvard, Cheng co-authored The Logic of Chemical Synthesis with Corey, the first three chapters of which explore computational and logic-based approaches to disassemble organic molecule "targets" (TGTs) through various transforms, leading to "retrons" and "synthons", e.g. simpler molecules that could be used to access the TGT. Noteworthy here is the Preface, which indicates that all structures found in the book were drawn "by computer", that is, with the then-new ChemDraw software package adapted by Stewart Rubenstein, David A. Evans, and Sally Evans.

== Research career ==
After Harvard, Cheng took a position at Warner-Lambert Research, later Pfizer, in Michigan, USA. Work there included ketopiperazine-based renin inhibitors, HMG-CoA inhibitors, and molecules against multiple other cardiovascular targets. Cheng contributed to the development of Lipitor, Pfizer's best selling product. In 2006, Cheng moved to the University of Michigan as a research associate professor. Around this time, Cheng and fellow Pfizer chemist Helen T. Lee formed AAPharmaSyn, a global chemistry contract research organization.

Since 2011, Cheng and colleagues at Michigan have focused their efforts on DARPA-backed dendrimeric drug delivery systems for battlefield use.

As of 2008, Cheng is the inventor or coinventor on 18 patents.
