= Camille G. Wermuth =

French chemist

Camille Georges Wermuth (died September 2015) was a chemist in the Laboratoire de Pharmacochimie Moleculaire at the Universite Louis Pasteur in Illkirch, France. He is particularly known for his editing of The Practice of Medicinal Chemistry (1996) which has been issued in four editions.

== Selected publications ==
- The Practice of Medicinal Chemistry. 1996.
