= Uroerythrin =

Names
- IUPAC name 1,14,15,17-tetrahydro-2,7,13-trimethyl-1,14-dioxo-3-vinyl-16H-tripyrrin-8,12-dipropionic acid
- Other names Biotripyrrin-a

Identifiers
CAS Number	158649-79-7
3D model (JSmol)	Interactive image
ChemSpider	8474026
PubChem CID	10298558
- InChI: InChI=1S/C25H27N3O6/c1-5-15-13(3)24(33)27-19(15)10-18-12(2)16(6-8-22(29)30)20(26-18)11-21-17(7-9-23(31)32)14(4)25(34)28-21/h5,10-11,26H,1,6-9H2,2-4H3,(H,27,33)(H,28,34)(H,29,30)(H,31,32)/b19-10+,21-11+ Key: DXWHHYOVLWSVQD-WOEXBRBNSA-N; InChI=1/C25H27N3O6/c1-5-15-13(3)24(33)27-19(15)10-18-12(2)16(6-8-22(29)30)20(26-18)11-21-17(7-9-23(31)32)14(4)25(34)28-21/h5,10-11,26H,1,6-9H2,2-4H3,(H,27,33)(H,28,34)(H,29,30)(H,31,32)/b19-10+,21-11+ Key: DXWHHYOVLWSVQD-WOEXBRBNBP
- SMILES: CC1=C(/C(=C/C2=C(C(=C(N2)/C=C\3/C(=C(C(=O)N3)C)C=C)C)CCC(=O)O)/NC1=O)CCC(=O)O

Properties
Chemical formula	C_{25}H_{27}N_{3}O_{6}
Molar mass	465.498
- Except where otherwise noted, data are given for materials in their standard state (at 25 °C [77 °F], 100 kPa). Infobox references

Uroerythrin is a red pigment present in the urine, where it is part of a group of yellow, brown and red pigments generally designated as urochrome.

== Urinary pigments ==
Pigments excreted in urine are partially absorbed by urate sediments ( sedimentum lateritium ), which consists of cell debris and sedimented urinary components formed when the acidified urine is stored below room temperature. These urate sediments looks reddish or pink due to the presence of a main pigment first introduced by Simons in 1842 as uroerythrin,

== Clinical significance ==
From early clinical observations it is known that uroerythrin is present in every urine and increased amounts are observed in pathological states, e.g. metabolic disorders with high fever or tissue degradation.

== Chemical structure ==
The chemical structure of most of urochromes is still unknown, since they are very labile pigments that are easily decomposed in the light. In particular uroerythrin, remains unresolved until 1975 with previous papers that describes it like a peptidic compound. In 1975 its structure was described based on mass spectrometry, infrared spectroscopy and nuclear magnetic resonance.
