= Perfect rectangle =

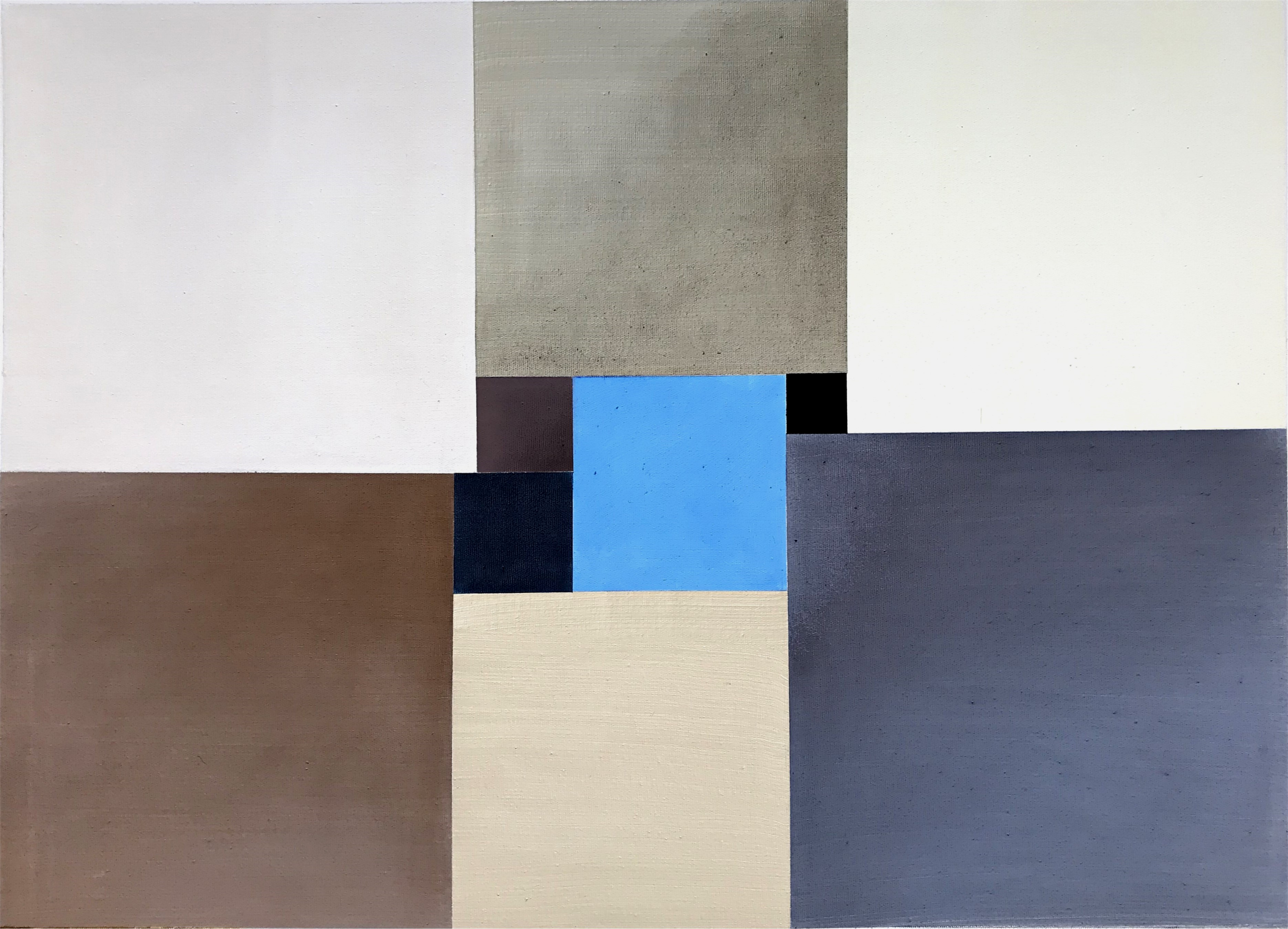
Perfect rectangle made of 10 squares in concrete art (Image by the painter Irene Schramm-Biermann)

A perfect rectangle is a rectangle that can be divided into squares of different sizes. If a perfect rectangle is specifically a square, it is analogously called a perfect square.

A rectangle that is not perfect is also called an imperfect rectangle.

== Discoverers of perfect rectangles (selection) ==
Many mathematicians have been involved in the discovery of perfect rectangles and perfect squares.

Below is a selection of important discoveries in this field.

- 1925: Zbigniew Moroń decomposed a perfect smallest possible 33x32 rectangle into nine squares.
- 1939: The German mathematician Roland Sprague published a large perfect square with 55 squares.
- 1978: A. J. W. Duijvestijn dissected a perfect square into 21 squares with a total side length of 112, where 21 is the lowest possible number of subsquares of perfect squares.

== Perfect rectangles with special properties ==
Among the numerous perfect rectangles and squares, the following selected examples are intended to highlight some special features.

(The numbers in the squares indicate their respective side lengths.)

Smallest possible perfect rectangle (9 squares, Moroń)

Perfect rectangle with many squares (22 squares)

Almost symmetrical perfect rectangle (12 squares)

Elongated perfect rectangle (17 squares)

Perfect rectangle with a remarkably large side length of 7 for the smallest sub-square (10 squares)

Smallest possible simple perfect square (21 squares, Duijvestijn)
