= Smith diagram =

Smith diagram or Smith diagramme may refer to:

- Smith chart, a diagram by American electrical engineer Phillip Hagar Smith, used in electrical engineering
- Smith fatigue strength diagram, a diagram by British mechanical engineer James Henry Smith, used in mechanical engineering
- Smith diagram (combinatorics), a diagram by British statistian Cedric Austen Bardell Smith
