= Dividing a square into similar rectangles =

Mathematical problem

Three partitions of a square into similar rectangles

Dividing a square into similar rectangles (or, equivalently, tiling a square with similar rectangles) is a problem in mathematics.

== Three rectangles ==
There is only one way (up to rotation and reflection) to divide a square into two similar rectangles.

However, there are three distinct ways of partitioning a square into three similar rectangles:

1. The trivial solution given by three congruent rectangles with aspect ratio 3:1.
2. The solution in which two of the three rectangles are congruent and the third one has twice the side length of the other two, where the rectangles have aspect ratio 3:2.
3. The solution in which the three rectangles are all of different sizes and where they have aspect ratio ρ^{2}, where ρ is the plastic ratio.

The fact that a rectangle of aspect ratio ρ^{2} can be used for dissections of a square into similar rectangles is equivalent to an algebraic property of the number ρ^{2} related to the Routh–Hurwitz theorem: all of its conjugates have positive real part.

== Generalization to n rectangles ==
In 2022, the mathematician John Baez brought the problem of generalizing this problem to n rectangles to the attention of the Mathstodon online mathematics community.

The problem has two parts: what aspect ratios are possible, and how many different solutions are there for a given n. Frieling and Rinne had previously published a result in 1994 that states that the aspect ratio of rectangles in these dissections must be an algebraic number and that each of its conjugates must have a positive real part. However, their proof was not a constructive proof.

Numerous participants have attacked the problem of finding individual dissections using exhaustive computer search of possible solutions. One approach is to exhaustively enumerate possible coarse-grained placements of rectangles, then convert these to candidate topologies of connected rectangles. Given the topology of a potential solution, the determination of the rectangle's aspect ratio can then trivially be expressed as a set of simultaneous equations, thus either determining the solution exactly, or eliminating it from possibility.

The numbers of distinct valid dissections for different values of n, for n = 1, 2, 3, ..., are:

1, 1, 3, 11, 51, 245, 1372, 8522, ... (sequence A359146 in the OEIS).

== See also ==
- Squaring the square
