= Orbison illusion =

Optical illusion

Orbison illusion consisting of a square placed over radial lines.

The Orbison illusion (or Orbison's illusion) is an optical illusion first described by American psychologist William Orbison (1912–1952) in 1939.

The illusion consists of a two-dimensional figure, such as a circle or square, superimposed over a background of radial lines or concentric circles. The result is an optical illusion in which both the figure and the rectangle which contains it appear distorted; in particular, squares appear slightly bulged, circles appear elliptical, and the containing rectangle appears tilted.

== Further examples ==
Square distortion by concentric circles

Circle distortion by radial lines

Square distortion by beams
