= Trinity Mathematical Society =

The squared square upon which the Trinity Mathematical Society logo is based.

The Trinity Mathematical Society, abbreviated TMS, was founded in Trinity College, Cambridge in 1919 by G. H. Hardy to "promote the discussion of subjects of mathematical interest". It is the oldest mathematical university society in the United Kingdom and is believed to be the oldest existing subject society at any British university.

Today, the society is one of the largest societies in Trinity College, with nearly 600 members, and each year holds an extensive range of talks, together with social events including an annual cricket match against the Adams Society of St John's College, Cambridge.

The society has hosted a range of distinguished speakers, including: M.Atiyah, A.Baker; B.Birch; C.Birkar; B.Bollobás; M.Born; J.H.Conway; H.S.M.Coxeter; H.Davenport; P.Dirac; F.W.Dyson; O.R.Frisch; W.T.Gowers; G.H.Hardy; W.V.D.Hodge; P.Kaptiza; E.Landau; J.E.Littlewood; L.J.Mordell; R.Penrose; G.Polya; R.Rado; F.Ramsey; B.Russell; E.Rutherford; L.Susskind; P.Swinnerton-Dyer; J.J.Thomson; W.Thurston; F.Wilczek; L.Wittgenstein.

The logo of the society is the minimal perfect squared square.

== Significance of the apple ==
For historical reasons, the apple is very important symbolically to the society. An apple is dropped at the end of meetings to signify that the meeting is now social; the President bowls an apple as the first 'ball' at the annual cricket match; and, as outlined in the society's Standing Orders, an apple is part of the design of the Society tie.

== See also ==
- Apple (symbolism)
- Ulam spiral
