= Roland Sprague =

German mathematician (1894–1967)

Roland Percival Sprague (11 July 1894, Unterliederbach – 1 August 1967) was a German mathematician, known for the Sprague–Grundy theorem and for being the first mathematician to find a perfect squared square.

== Biography ==
With two mathematicians, Thomas Bond Sprague and Hermann Amandus Schwarz, as grandfathers, Roland Sprague was also a great-grandson of the mathematician Ernst Eduard Kummer and a great-grandson of the musical instrument maker Nathan Mendelssohn (1781–1852).

After graduation (Abitur) in 1912 from the Bismarck-Gymnasium in Berlin-Wilmersdorf, Sprague studied from 1912 to 1919 in Berlin and Göttingen with an interruption by military service from 1915 to 1918. In 1921 in Berlin he passed the state test for teaching in mathematics, chemistry, and physics. He was Studienassessor (probationary teacher at a secondary school) from 1922 at the Paulsen-Realgymnasium in Berlin-Steglitz and from 1924 at the Schiller-Gymnasium (temporarily named "Clausewitz-Schule") in Berlin-Charlottenburg, where he became in 1925 Studienrat (teacher at a secondary school).

In 1950 Sprague received a PhD under Alexander Dinghas at the Freie Universität Berlin with dissertation Über die eindeutige Bestimmbarkeit der Elemente einer endlichen Menge durch zweifache Einteilung. At the Pädagogische Hochschule Berlin, Sprague was from 1949 Dozent, from 1953 Oberstudienrat (senior teacher at a secondary school), and from 1955 Professor.

Sprague is known for his contributions to recreational mathematics, especially the Sprague–Grundy function and its application to combinatorial games, which Sprague and Patrick Michael Grundy discovered independently in 1935 and 1939 respectively. This result of Sprague's enabled mathematical strategies devised originally by Emanuel Lasker to be completed, and provided a method for calculating winning strategies for generalizations of the game of Nim.

== Selected works ==
- Über mathematische Kampfspiele, Tôhoku Mathematical Journal, vol. 41 (1935), pp. 438–444 (Online-Version).
- Über zwei Abarten von Nim, Tôhoku Mathematical Journal, vol. 43 (1937), pp. 451–454 (Online-Version).
- Unterhaltsame Mathematik : Neue Probleme, überraschende Lösungen, 2nd edition, 1969.
