= Squaring the square =

Mathematical problem

The first perfect squared square published, a compound one of side 4205 and order 55. Each number denotes the side length of its square.

Squaring the square is the problem of tiling an integral square using only other integral squares. (An integral square is a square whose sides have integer length.) The name was coined in a humorous analogy with squaring the circle. Squaring the square is an easy task unless additional conditions are set. The most studied restriction is that the squaring be perfect, meaning the sizes of the smaller squares are all different. A related problem is squaring the plane, which can be done even with the restriction that each natural number occurs exactly once as a size of a square in the tiling. The order of a squared square is its number of constituent squares.

== Perfect squared squares ==
A square cut into 10 pieces

Smith diagram of a rectangle

For any integer $n$ other than 2, 3, and 5, it is possible to dissect a square into $n$ squares of one or two different sizes. A "perfect" squared square is a square such that each of the smaller squares has a different size.

Perfect squared squares were studied by R. L. Brooks, C. A. B. Smith, A. H. Stone and W. T. Tutte (writing under the collective pseudonym "Blanche Descartes") at Cambridge University between 1936 and 1938. They transformed the square tiling into an equivalent electrical circuit – they called it a "Smith diagram" – by considering the squares as resistors that connected to their neighbors at their top and bottom edges, and then applied Kirchhoff's circuit laws and circuit decomposition techniques to that circuit. The first perfect squared squares they found were of order 69.

The first perfect squared square to be published, a compound one of side 4205 and order 55, was found by Roland Sprague in 1939.

Martin Gardner published an extensive article written by W. T. Tutte about the early history of squaring the square in his Mathematical Games column of November 1958.

Lowest-order perfect squared square (1) and the three smallest perfect squared squares (2–4): all are simple squared squares

== Simple squared squares ==
A "simple" squared square is one where no subset of more than one of the squares forms a rectangle or square. When a squared square has a square or rectangular subset, it is "compound".

In 1978, A. J. W. Duijvestijn discovered a simple perfect squared square of side 112 with the smallest number of squares using a computer search. His tiling uses 21 squares, and has been proved to be minimal. This squared square forms the logo of the Trinity Mathematical Society at Cambridge in England. It also appears on the cover of the Journal of Combinatorial Theory.

Duijvestijn also found two simple perfect squared squares of sides 110 but each comprising 22 squares. Theophilus Harding Willcocks, an amateur mathematician and fairy chess composer, found another. In 1999, I. Gambini proved that these three are the smallest perfect squared squares in terms of side length.

The perfect compound squared square with the fewest squares was discovered by T.H. Willcocks in 1946 and has 24 squares; however, it was not until 1982 that Duijvestijn, Pasquale Joseph Federico and P. Leeuw mathematically proved it to be the lowest-order example.

== Mrs. Perkins's quilt ==
Dudeney's unique (up to rotation and reflection) solution to his Mrs. Perkins's quilt problem of squaring a square with sides of 13 units – squares of the same size are similarly coloured

When the constraint of all the squares being different sizes is relaxed, a squared square such that the side lengths of the smaller squares do not have a common divisor larger than 1 is called a "Mrs. Perkins's quilt". As the greatest common divisor of all the smaller side lengths should be 1, a 2k × 2k square, for example, cannot be divided into four k × k squares, where k ≥ 2. The Mrs. Perkins's quilt problem asks for a Mrs. Perkins's quilt with the fewest pieces for a given $n\times n$ square. The number of pieces required is at least $\log_2 n$, and at most $6\log_2 n$. Computer searches have found exact solutions for small values of $n$ (small enough to need up to 18 pieces). For $n=1,2,3,\dots$ the number of pieces required is:

1, 4, 6, 7, 8, 9, 9, 10, 10, 11, 11, 11, 11, 12, 12, 12, 12, 13, ... (sequence A005670 in the OEIS)

== Perfect squaring of the plane ==
Tiling the plane with different integral squares using the Fibonacci series

In 1975, Solomon Golomb raised the question whether the whole plane can be tiled by squares, one of each integer edge-length, which he called the heterogeneous tiling conjecture. This problem was later publicized by Martin Gardner in his Scientific American column and appeared in several books, but it defied solution for over 30 years.

The plane can easily be tiled by different integral squares using the Fibonacci series (see figure)
1. Tiling with squares with Fibonacci-number sides is almost perfect except for two squares of side 1.
2. Duijvestijn found a 110-square tiled with 22 different integer squares.
3. Scaling the Fibonacci tiling by 110 times and replacing one of the 110-squares with Duijvestijn's perfects the tiling.

In Tilings and patterns, published in 1987, Branko Grünbaum and G. C. Shephard describe a way of tiling of the plane by integral squares by recursively taking any perfect squared square and enlarging it so that the formerly smallest tile has the size of the original squared square, then replacing this tile with a copy of the original squared square. The recursive scaling process increases the sizes of the squares exponentially – skipping most integers – a feature which they note was true of all perfect integral tilings of the plane known at that time.

In 2008 James Henle and Frederick Henle proved Golomb's heterogeneous tiling conjecture: there exists a tiling of the plane by squares, one of each integer size. Their proof is constructive and proceeds by "puffing up" an L-shaped region formed by two side-by-side and horizontally flush squares of different sizes to a perfect tiling of a larger rectangular region, then adjoining the square of the smallest size not yet used to get another, larger L-shaped region. The squares added during the puffing up procedure have sizes that have not yet appeared in the construction and the procedure is set up so that the resulting rectangular regions are expanding in all four directions, which leads to a tiling of the whole plane.

== Cubing the cube ==
Cubing the cube is the analogue in three dimensions of squaring the square: that is, given a cube C, the problem of dividing it into finitely many smaller cubes, no two congruent.

Unlike the case of squaring the square, a hard yet solvable problem, there is no perfect cubed cube and, more generally, no dissection of a rectangular cuboid C into a finite number of unequal cubes.

To prove this, we start with the following claim: for any perfect dissection of a rectangle in squares, the smallest square in this dissection does not lie on an edge of the rectangle. Indeed, each corner square has a smaller adjacent edge square, and the smallest edge square is adjacent to smaller squares not on the edge.

Now suppose that there is a perfect dissection of a rectangular cuboid in cubes. Make a face of C its horizontal base. The base is divided into a perfect squared rectangle R by the cubes which rest on it. The smallest square s_{1} in R is surrounded by larger, and therefore higher, cubes. Hence the upper face of the cube on s_{1} is divided into a perfect squared square by the cubes which rest on it. Let s_{2} be the smallest square in this dissection. By the claim above, this is surrounded on all 4 sides by squares which are larger than s_{2} and therefore higher.

The sequence of squares s_{1}, s_{2}, ... is infinite and the corresponding cubes are infinite in number. This contradicts our original supposition.

If a 4-dimensional hypercube could be perfectly hypercubed then its 'faces' would be perfect cubed cubes; this is impossible. Similarly, there is no solution for all cubes of higher dimensions.

== See also ==
- Square packing in a square
- Dividing a square into similar rectangles
- Perfect rectangle
