= William Orbison =

American psychologist

William Orbison (1912–1952) was an American psychologist. He is best known as the namesake of the Orbison illusion, which he first described in 1939.
