= Bullseye illusion =

Optical illusion

Bullseye illusion: The inner circle appears larger than the outer ring

The Bullseye illusion is a geometric optical illusion.

== Description ==
In Figures 1 to 4, the green circle appears larger than the blue ring. In reality, however, both areas have the same area.

Figure 1

Figure 2

Figure 3

Figure 4

== Mathematical background ==
The blue ring is formed by the difference in area between a larger circle with radius c and a smaller circle with radius b.

Let the green circle have radius a. Then the condition for the equality of the two areas is:

$\pi a^2=\pi c^2-\pi b^2$, i.e.,
$$a=\sqrt{c^2-b^2}$$.

For the special case $a=b$ (Figure 4), the condition for the equality of the two areas is:

$\pi b^2=\pi c^2-\pi b^2$, i.e.,
$$a=b=\frac{c}{\sqrt{2}}$$.

In this case, the larger circle is completely decomposed into the smaller green circle and the blue ring of equal area.
