= Double-nail illusion =

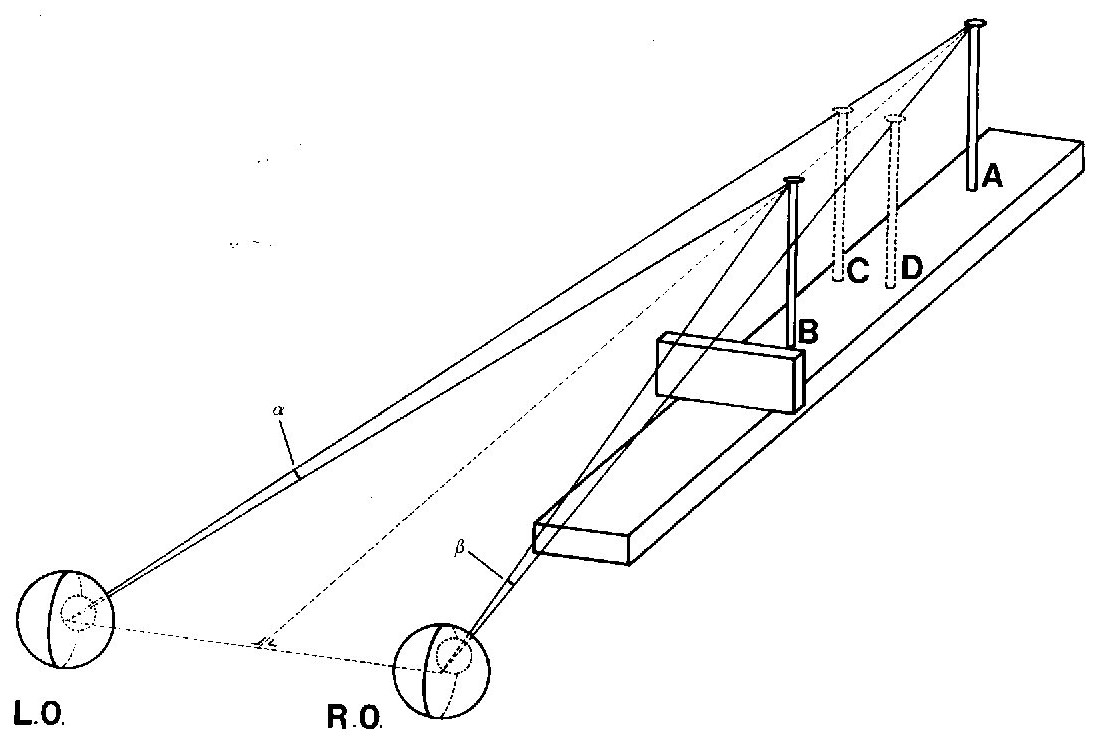
Basic double-nail illusion: the two pins A en B appear at positions C en D.

The double-nail illusion is a multi-modal illusion in which two similar physical objects, which are located one behind the other in depth, appear visually to be next to each other (at a depth about halfway between the two physically present objects) instead of one being directly behind the other.

This observation cannot be explained on the basis of classical theories of binocular depth perception (Krol 1982, p. 28-33), but it can be explained by binocular ghosts in a neural network.

The basic setup was mentioned in 1950 by Rønne and rediscovered and systematically investigated in 1978 by Krol, see Research history.

The conditions for the illusion and the main observations are described under Basic double-nail illusion, under Measurements of ghost images and under Variations. Related observations are listed under Edges and surfaces.

== Basic double-nail illusion ==
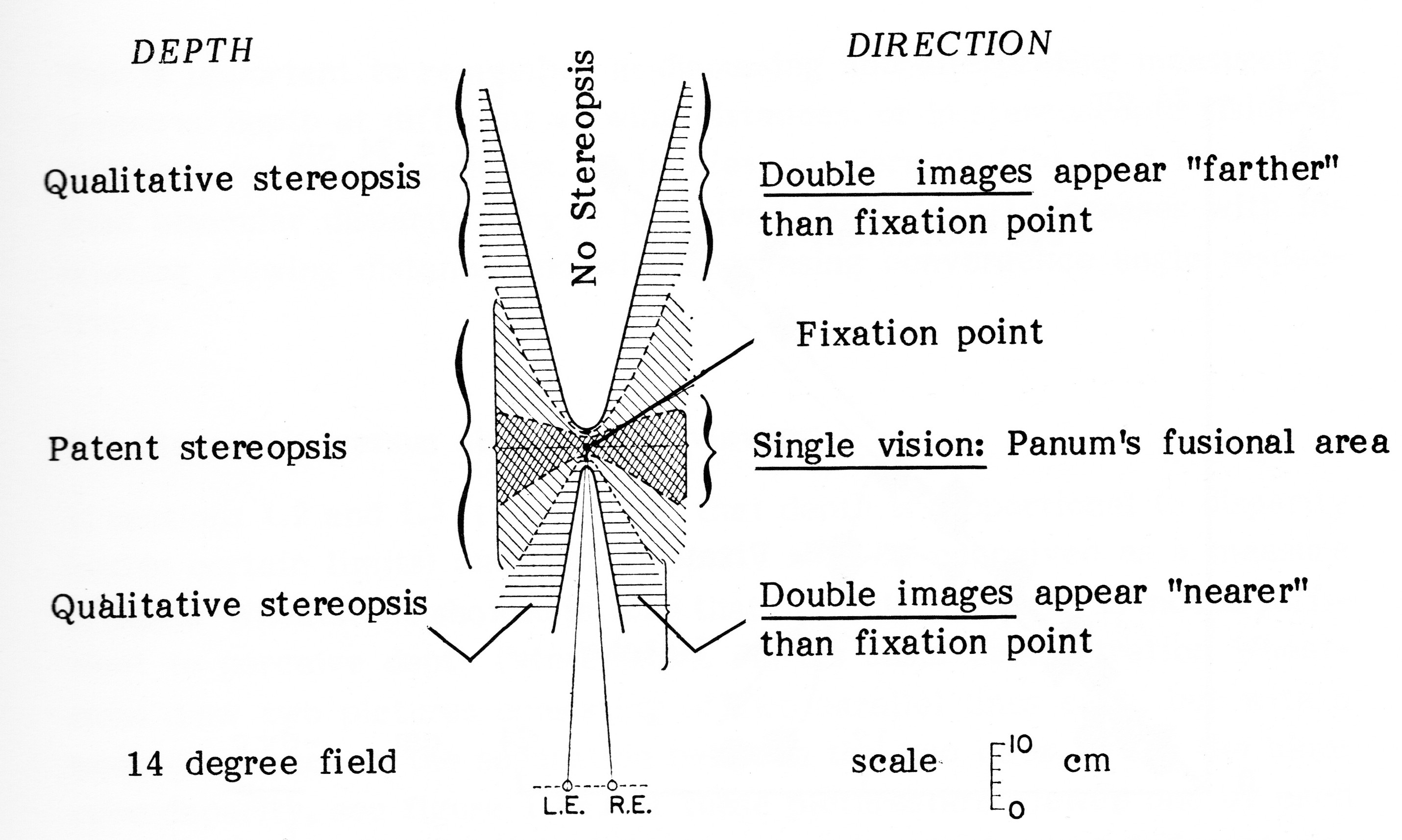
Depth perception and fusion (Ogle).

Identical images. In the basic illusion, the two objects are upright in the visual field at the same height and with the same length and colour, and are behind each other, in line with the nose (Krol 1982, p. 25).

Area for fine stereopsis. In order to experience the illusion, both real objects must be within the range for fine stereopsis (in the figure: patent stereopsis) (Krol 1982, p. 10-13). At a viewing distance of 30 cm, this area has a range of only 7 – 22 mm straight ahead, symmetrically around the fixation point; further to the side, the range increases rapidly. This means that the maximum distance between the two objects may be between 7 and 22 mm, provided that the eyes are focused on a point in the middle between the two objects. If the eyes are focused on the front (or back) object, this object is seen as a single fused image, and the other object as a double image without depth on the viewing distance (horopter). These observations are predicted by classical findings for binocular depth perception. The binocular ghosts (C, D) are not seen.

Distance. If the viewing distance to the two objects is increased, the depth range in mm increases. The distance between the two objects can then be greater. Conversely, if the viewing distance is reduced, the distance between the objects must be smaller. By varying the viewing distance, it is possible to switch between seeing the illusion and seeing the double images (Krol 1982, p. 27).

Nose support to fix the head.

Convergence. If an observer with normal vision focuses his attention on both objects, both eyes automatically cohere and accommodate at a point between the two objects. This is increasingly the case as the distance between the two objects becomes smaller. At the moment this happens, a stable state is created in which it is more difficult to converge at a different distance. This means that once the illusion is seen, it is easy to continue seeing it (Krol 1982, p. 29-30). Nose rest. The illusion is very sensitive to disturbances, and can be evoked most quickly with a viewing arrangement that is precisely aligned and in which the position of the head is stabilized, for example with a nose rest (Krol 1982, p. 51). But it can also be done with the following simple demonstration.

== Ghosts in a neural network ==
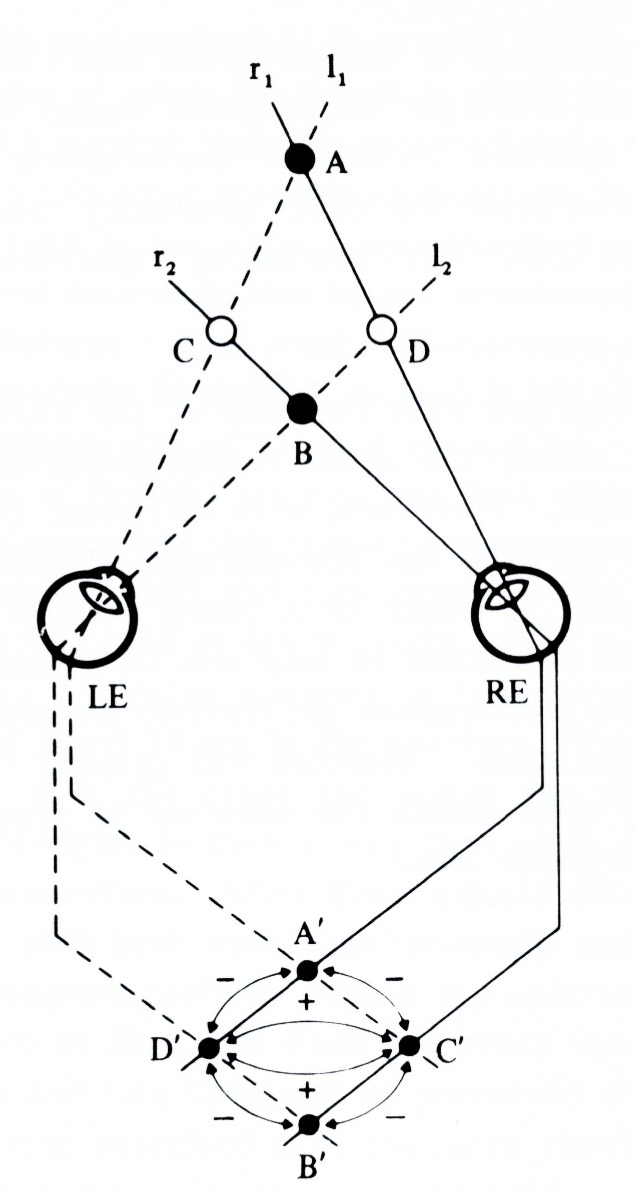
Neuromodel patent stereopsis. C' and D' signal ghost images.

The lower part of the figure contains a simplified representation of the neuromodel that initiated the investigation of the double-nail illusion (Krol 1982, p. 20). This model is based on the existence in the visual cortex of nerve cells with input from both eyes, which are tuned to a particular binocular disparity.

In the double-nail illusion, four binocular cells A', B', C' and D' are stimulated, which signal the location and depth of A, B, C and D. If there were no interaction between the cells, the model predicts that four objects should be perceived.

To explain the observation in the double-nail illusion, it is assumed that the binocular cells, when activated, influence each other as follows:

1. Cells tuned to the same depth (disparity) amplify each other's activity (+);
2. Cells tuned to different depths (disparities) attenuate each other's activity (−).

The result is that C' and D' become extra activated and ghost images are seen, and A' and B' suppress each other's activity and become silent, with the result that the physically present objects A and B are not perceived. This mechanism could also explain the perceived depth in the random dot stereograms of Bela Julesz.

The above explanation applies to the situation where the two actual stimuli are within the range of stereopsis. If A and B are further apart and fall outside this area, then according to the model, A and B are not seen because there are no binocular cells that can signal the presence of an object. In other words, there cannot and need not be any interaction between binocular neurons to explain the perception, as in the Wheatstone stereogram below.

The model described above is part of a model that, in addition to fine stereopsis, also includes single vision and double vision (Krol 1982, p. 53-79).

== Measurements of ghost images ==
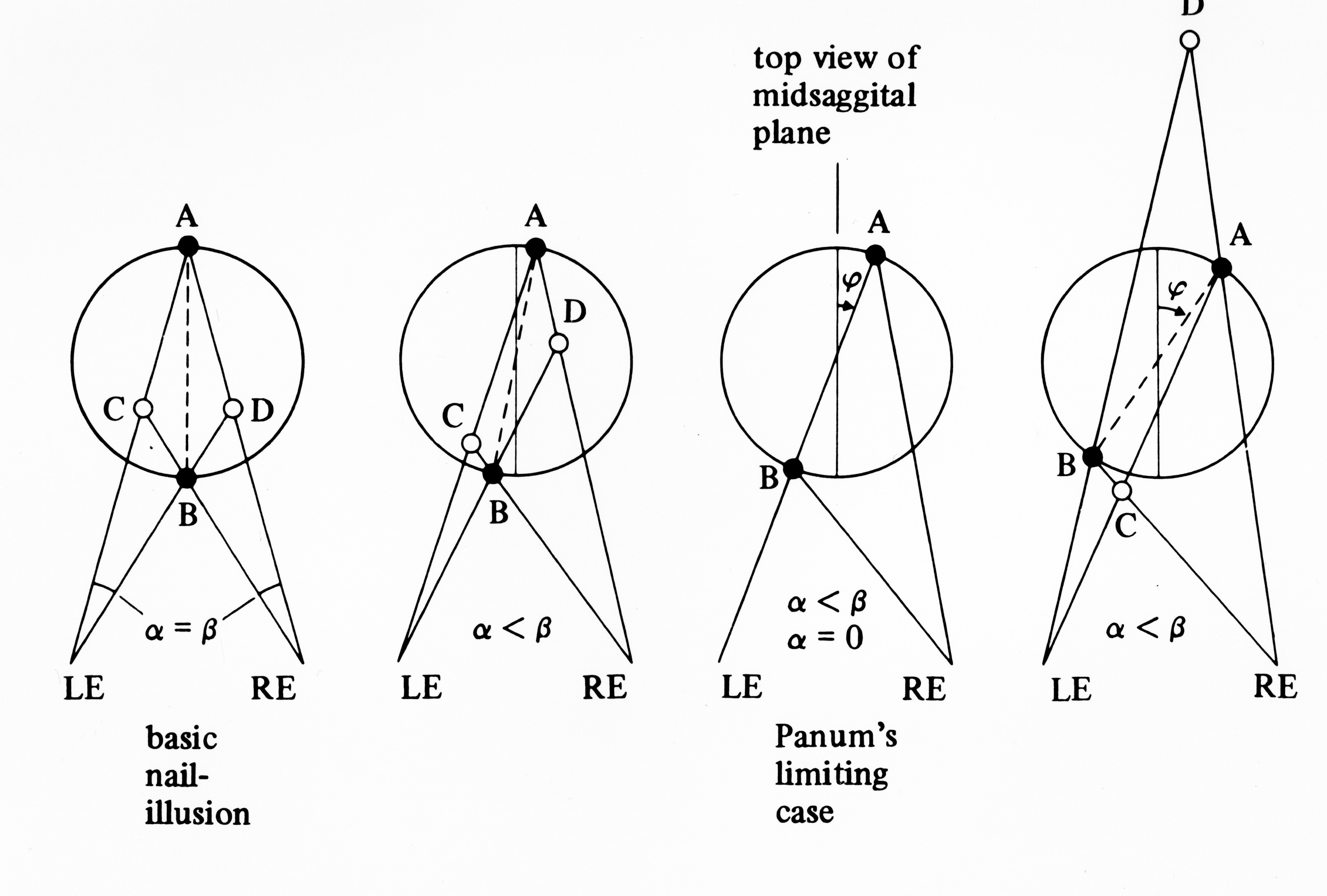
Ghost images in relation to inclination

Krol (1982, p. 40-48) investigated the exact position at which ghost images are observed when the double-nail arrangement is rotated out of the mid-sagittal plane (inclination): see the figure. If the two real objects A and B are rotated around a point midway between A and B, the geometric ghost images C and D slowly shift apart in depth: see the two left pictures. In the third picture, Panum's limiting case, AB and CD coincide. With even greater rotation (right picture), C and D move apart very quickly.

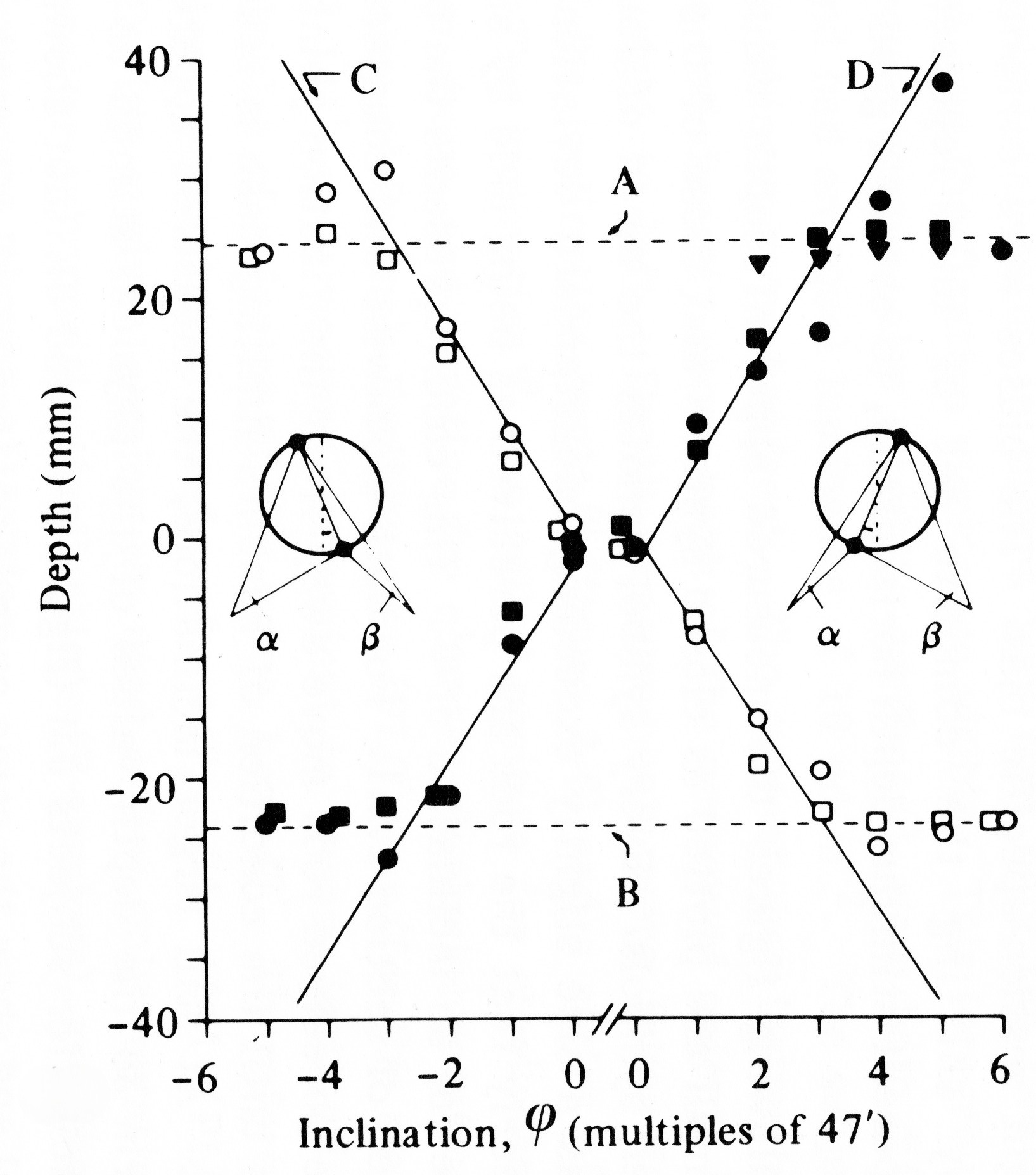
Depth measurement of double-nail images

Observers in the experiments had to fix a fixed point and indicate with a pointer where the observed left and right images were located. (Whether the observer fixed the point correctly was determined with a monocular vernier line in each eye.)

Figure Depth measurements shows a typical measurement. The figure shows the actual depth positions of A, B, C and D relative to the fixation distance. The symbols show the perceived depth. At small inclinations (rotations) the perceived images are seen at the positions of the ghost images C, D. From Panum's limiting case the images are seen at the positions of the real images A, B. The latter can be explained by the fact that C, D are then outside the area for stereopsis.

Conclusion: at small inclinations the binocular ghost images (C, D) are indeed seen. At inclinations greater than Panum's limiting case the real objects (A, B) are seen.

== Variants ==
The hypothesis that binocular ghost images are seen in the basic double-nail illusion leads to the prediction of different appearances when the fixation point and the distance, shape or orientation of the two "nails" are varied. These variations have been demonstrated (Krol 1982, p. 27-39):

- Thickness difference: If the front and back objects are unequally thick (for example 0.75 and 1.5 mm), two rotated surfaces are seen, the amount of rotation being predicted by the thickness difference (Krol 1982, p. 27-28), see figure.
- Length difference: If the front and back objects are unequally long, the illusion only occurs for the part where both objects are the same height. The part that protrudes above this is seen at its actual position and appears to float. If the shortest object has a ball, this ball is seen at its actual position and appears to float (Krol 1982, p. 27-33), see figure.
- Vergence: The illusion occurs when the eyes converge between the front and back objects and the distance between the objects is small enough. If the vergence is shifted from a point midway between both objects to the front or back object, the fixed object is seen single and the other object double; the illusion does not occur (Krol 1982, p. 27-33).
- Distance: At a viewing distance of an arm's length, the illusion only occurs at a small distance between the two objects, in the order of millimeters. If the distance between the two objects is increased or the viewing distance is decreased, the front or back object is automatically converged and the other object is seen double; the illusion does not occur (Krol 1982, p. 27-33).
- Inclination with double image: If the front object has a small ball and the distance between the objects is increased and the setup is rotated a few degrees (inclination), the following can be seen: the front ball appears as a double image at the fixation distance, the ghost images appear slightly behind it and shifted in depth (Krol (1982, p. 32), see figure inclination with double image.
- Tilt: If the front and back objects tilt relative to each other in a left-right direction, the perceived objects tilt in depth (Krol 1982, p. 36-38), see figure tilt.
- Contrast difference: if the front and back objects are both lighter or darker than the background, the depth illusion is unchanged and independent of the contrast between the two. If one object is lighter and the other darker than the background, no fusion is possible and double images are seen of either the front or the back object, near the distance of the horopter (Krol 1982, p. 39).
- Color difference: if the front and back objects have a red and a green ball respectively at the same height, the depth illusion is unchanged. The balls are seen next to each other, with the left one being green at different times and the right one being red and vice versa, or both having the same color. No color mixing is seen (Krol 1982, p. 38-39).
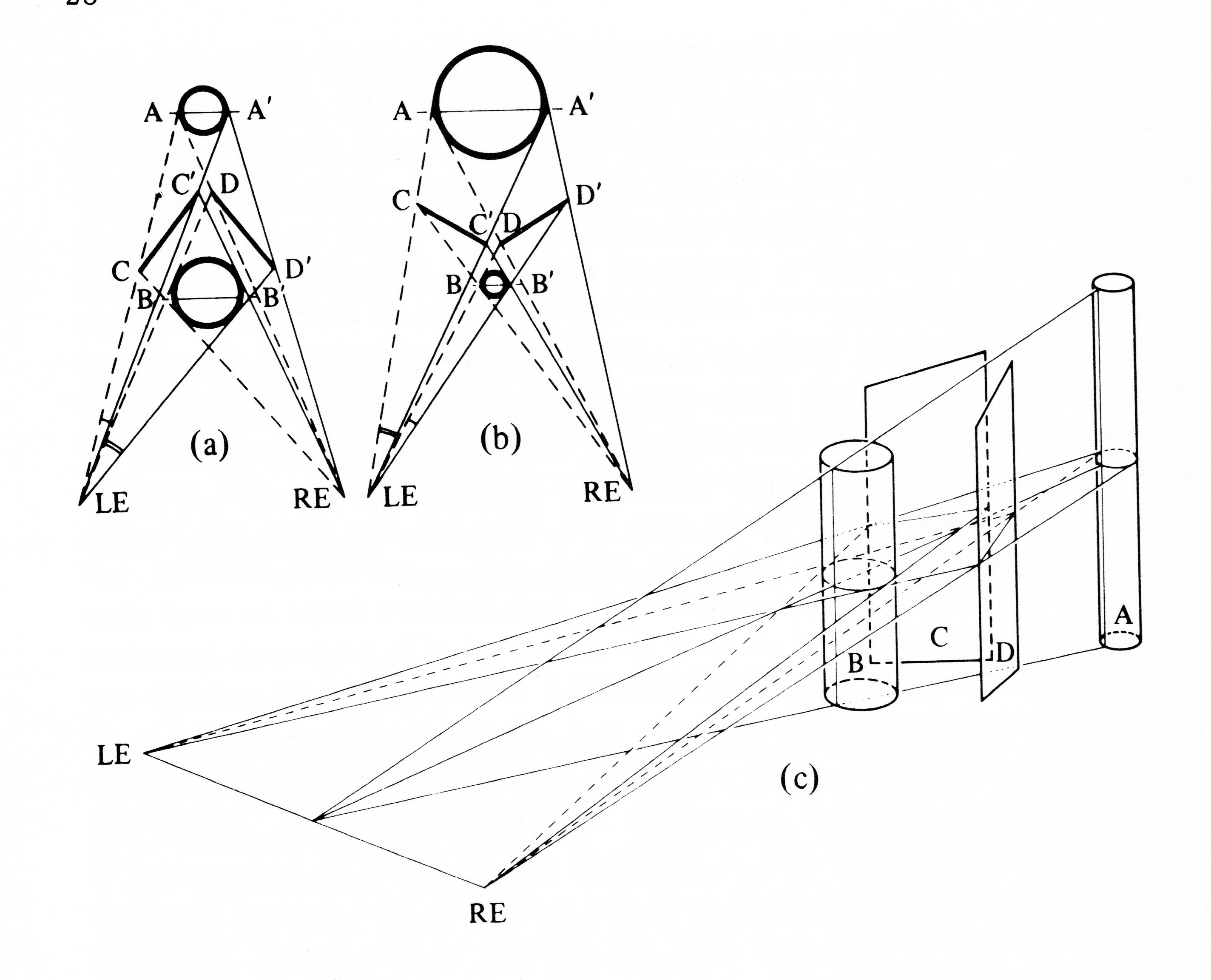
Thickess difference: swinging doors.

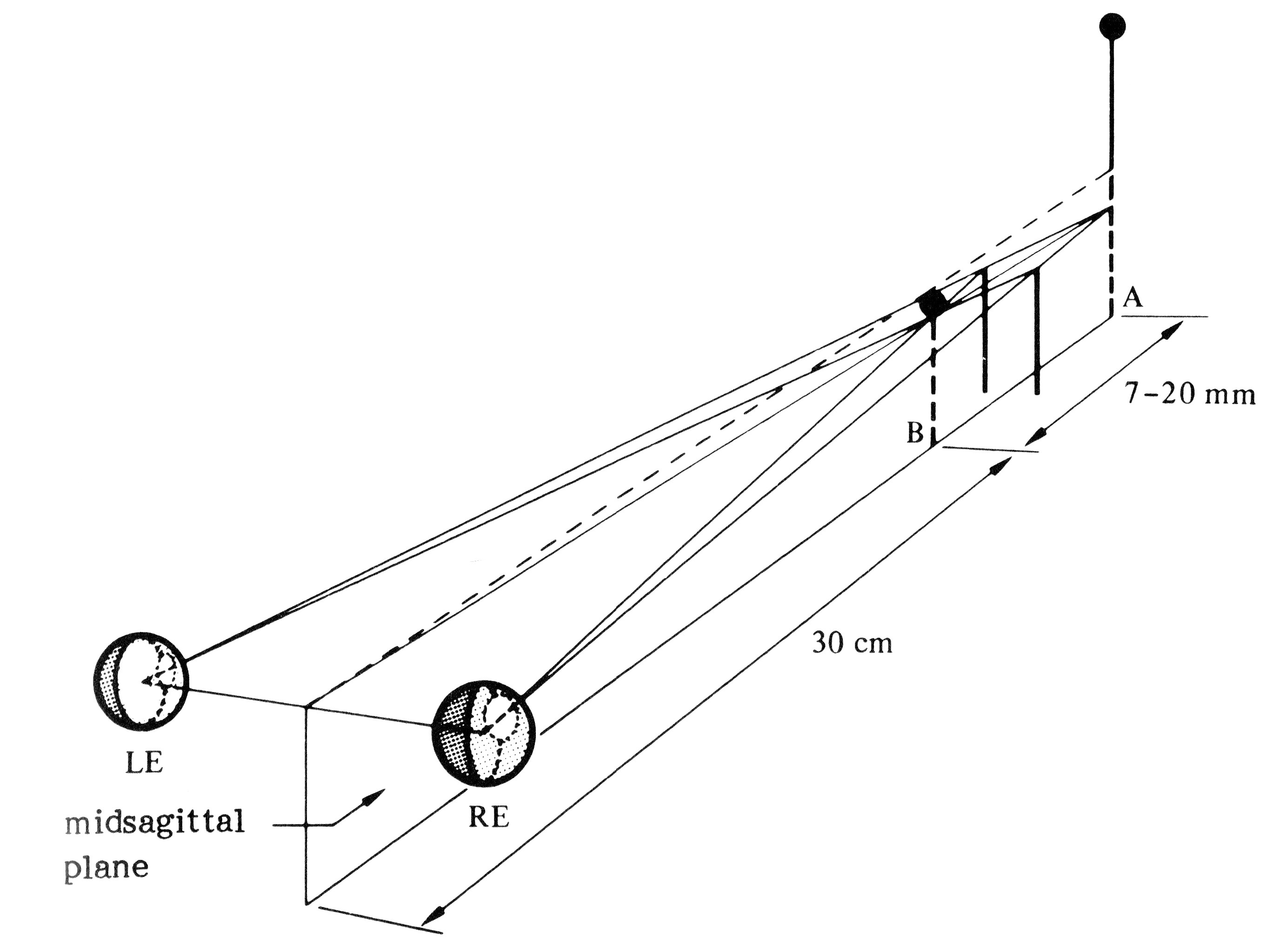
Length difference. Dotted lines are not seen.

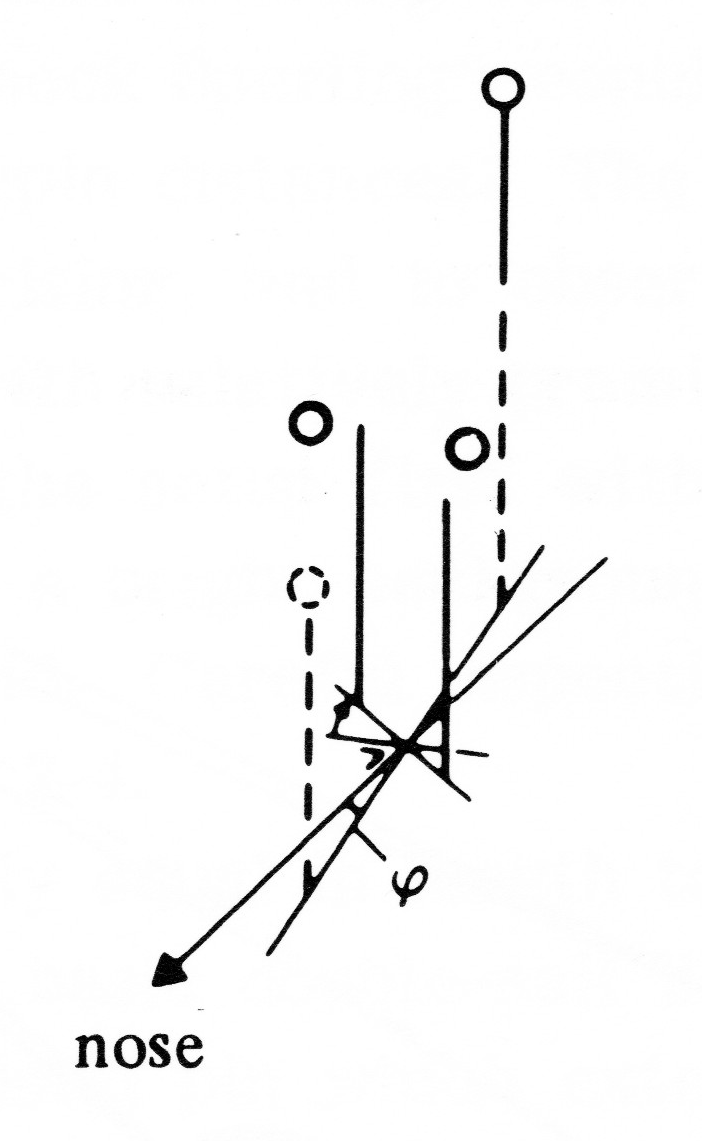
Inclination with double images.

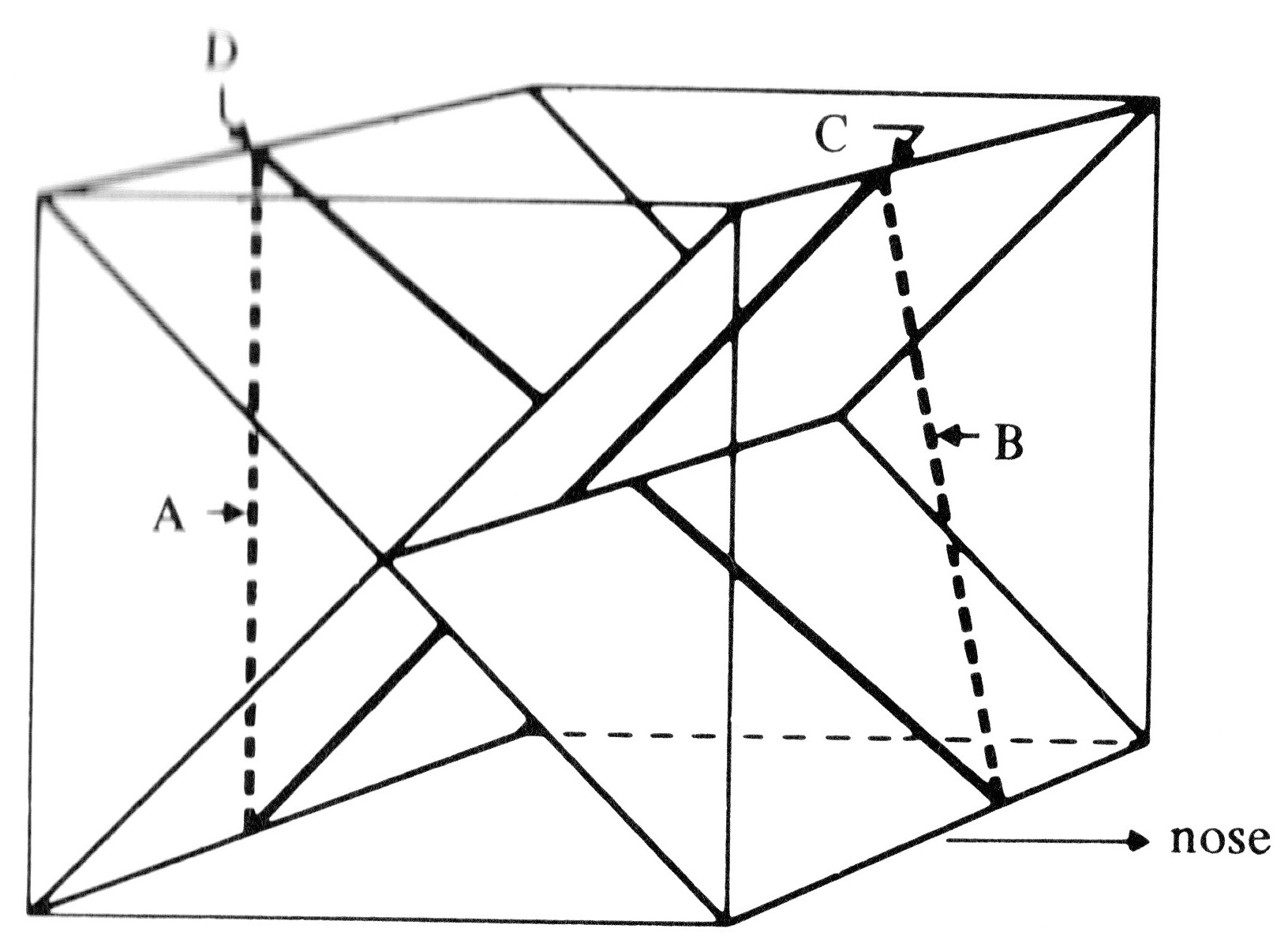
Tilt. The planes serve as a help to illustrate the leaning. Viewing direction from R to L.

== Edges and surfaces ==
=== Disparity detection ===
According to Hering (1864) the visual system detects "edges" and then fills in surfaces between these edges. No binocular color mixing occurs in this (Krol 1982, p. 38-39). Julesz (1971) confirmed with random dot stereograms that disparity detection precedes shape detection.

=== Equal contrast sign ===
Each object of the double-nail illusion consists of a plane with a left and a right edge, where the left edge is a light-dark transition and the right edge a dark-light transition, or vice versa. Krol (1982, p. 81-124) has shown that only edges with the same transition in the left and right eyes together give a depth experience. With an opposite contrast there is no depth detection based on disparity, and the eyes automatically converge so that edges with opposite contrast do not fall on corresponding points in both eyes. The resulting fixation disparity gives a small, qualitative depth effect (Krol 1982, p. 94-112).

=== Midsagittal-strip illsusion ===
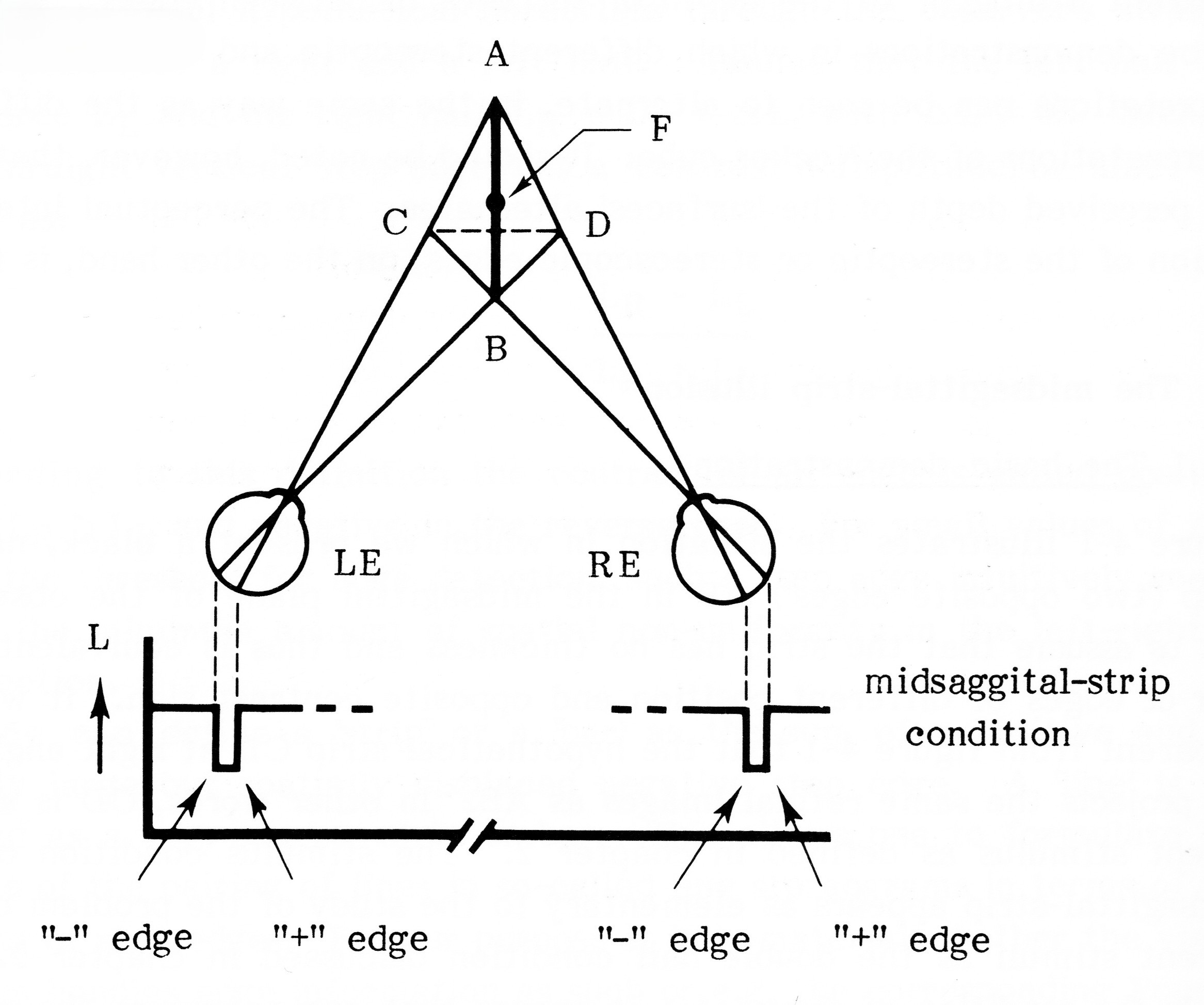
Midsagittal-strip illusion. In 3D plane CD is seen, AB is not.

As a result of the equal-contrast rule, the mid-sagittal strip illusion occurs: if a narrow plane such as a razor blade is held in the mid-sagittal plane, then edges A and B have opposite contrast and edges C and D have equal contrast. The apparent plane CD is seen and the real plane AB is not; this is not a double-nail illusion (Krol, 1982 p. 84). The equal-contrast rule also explains the observed rotated planes when the two objects of the double-nail illusion differ in thickness.

=== Ambiguous 3D-surfaces ===
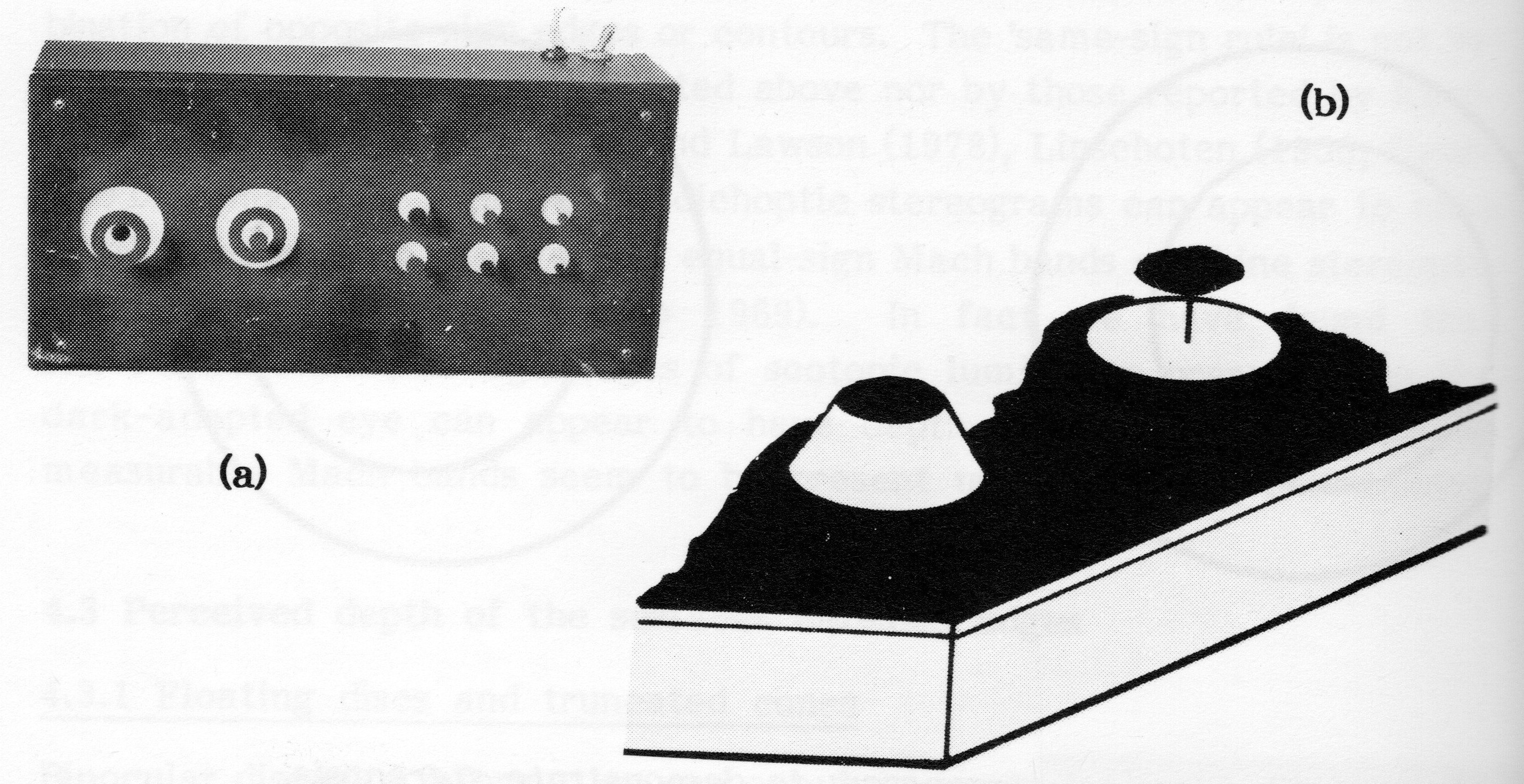
Ambiguous surfaces in 3D: cone vs disc

In the demonstration in figure "Ambiguous surfaces" the observer cannot distinguish between seeing a disk on a pin above a white background, and a white truncated cone with a black top-plane. In both cases a black floating disk and a white cone are seen alternately (Krol 1982, p. 114).

== Multi-modal illusion ==
The double-nail illusion is an illusion in which the perceptions via the eyes and touch, conflict with each other and with physical reality (Krol 1982, p. 4-5). By looking from different positions, the observer can know what the "true" situation is, based on visual information from different perspectives. By feeling with a finger, the observer can be aware that the physical objects are (in fact) present and the perceived objects (illusory images) are not. If the observer changes the orientation of the two nails with respect to each other a tiny bit, a movement in depth is perceived that does not correspond to the movement performed, see "rotation" and "tilting" in the variations. In addition, the physical objects in the double-nail illusion contain, due to their physical difference in distance, subtle monocular depth cues that could betray the true nature of the perceived images. The illusion also occurs if the two physical objects can be clearly distinguished from each other by color (for example, one red and the other green); in perception, the color of the perceived images then alternates between the two colors. Despite all this, the ghost images are (still) seen. Krol and van de Grind describe that trying to feel the ghost images and seeing a different movement than the one being performed, gives an uncomfortable feeling that "something is not right here" and elicits a reflexive smile.

== Simple demonstration ==
Krol (1982, p. 26) describes a simple way to create the illusion using a needle and a mirror for the second object. The needle is held at a distance of about 30 cm, a few millimeters from the mirror, with as much of the needle as possible visible, and the top of the needle and the top of the mirror image seen at the same height, in line with the nose.

Whether the correct situation is present can be checked by closing the left and right eyes alternately, without moving the head or the needle, and noting whether each eye sees two needles that are right next to each other at the shortest possible distance.

N.B. The perception created when using a mirror image resembles, but is not exactly the same as, the physical illusion, see multimodal illusion.

== Simulation with a stereogram ==
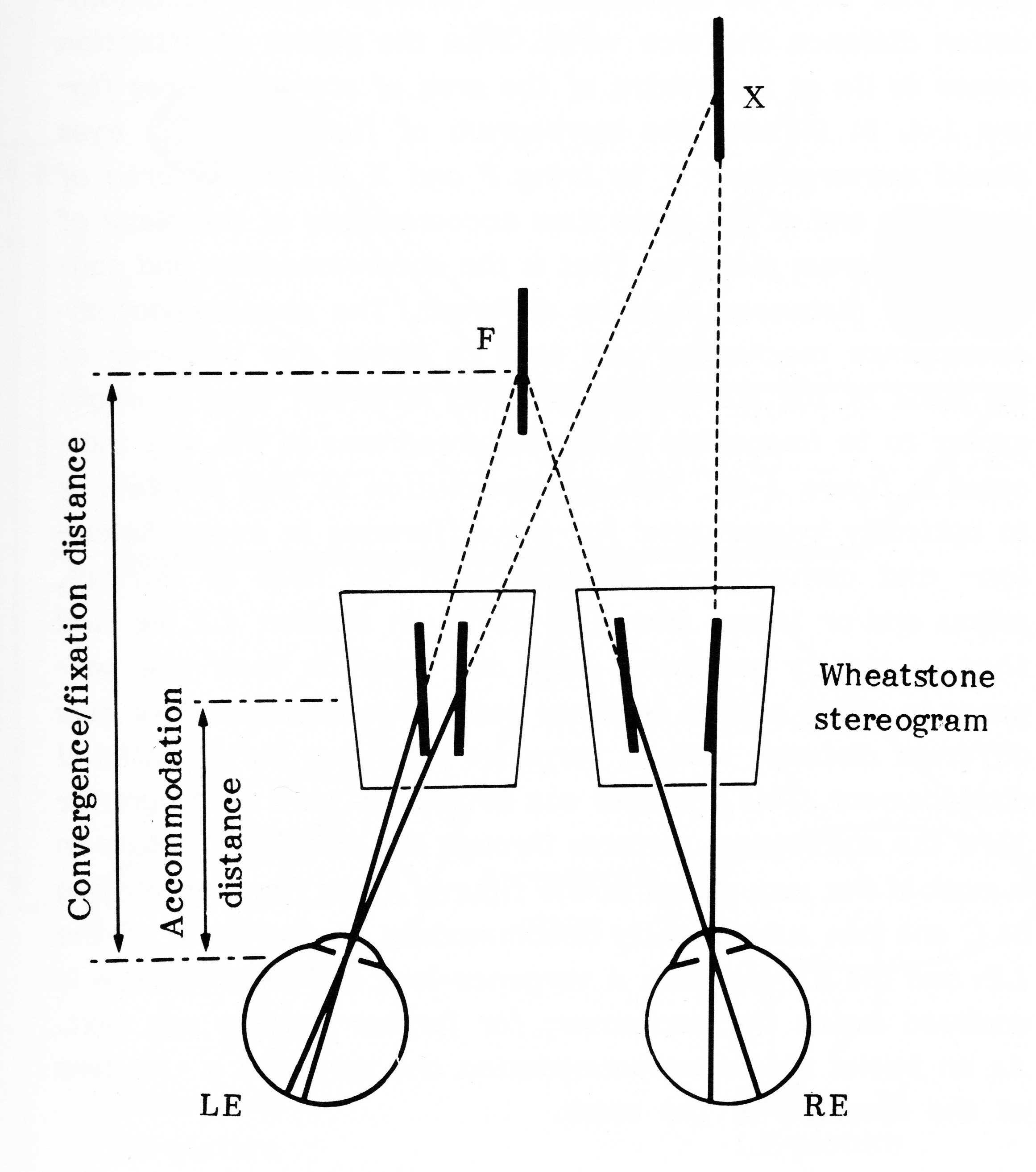
Wheatstone stereogram

Some researchers use a Wheatstone stereogram to evoke the double-nail illusion (Krol 1982, p. 24): see the figure. This stereogram consists of two images, one for each eye, with two parallel lines. In the classical figure of the Wheatstone stereogram, only the positions of the ghost images are illustrated (X and F correspond to C and D of the double-nail illusion). Wheatstone did not draw the projections of A and B, possibly because they lie far outside the area for depth perception. This situation is therefore not equivalent to the situation of the double-nail illusion.

Krol (1982, p. 24) suggests that a stereogram differs from the physical double-nail illusion because in a stereogram no physical objects are present and therefore it is not a multi-modal illusion.

In summary, two types of objects can be distinguished:

1. There is a physical object that can be touched but not perceived.
2. An object is observed at a position where it cannot be touched.

In stereograms, there are only physical objects in the form of the stereogram itself. There are no cues in the perceived image that indicate which objects are there or not. All perceived images are of type 2. In the double-nail illusion, there are both type 1 and type 2 images. The observer can discover which images are real by tactile perception, but this information is not used in visual perception.

== Research history ==
The research on the two-nail illusion has been described in several places and this research is summarized in Krol (1982).

The perception of the basic double-nail illusion can be described by Hering's cyclopean projection if the images are seen at the viewing distance (horopter); the observation of the variants cannot be explained in this way (Krol 1982 p. 59, 89-90).

Burt and Julesz (1980) explain the illusion by assuming that each object in the fusion region creates a "forbidden zone" through which other objects cannot be merged and cannot be seen. Krol and van de Grind (1982a) dispute this idea. Burt and Julesz(1982) have an answer to this, which is then refuted by Krol and van de Grind (1983), see also Krol (1982, p. 159-167).

Measurements of the depth position of the observed images for the different variants, confirm that the observed images are binocular ghost images. Ono published an alternative explanation in 1984. This alternative explanation has been refuted by Krol and van de Grind.

Krol and van de Grind (1986) show that some apparent depth effects are due to the eyes trying to prevent edges of opposite contrast from falling on corresponding parts of both eyes (depth due to vergence). Foley's alternative explanation of the two-spike illusion based on "depth blending" would thus also be refuted. (Krol 1982, p. 81-111, 125-144) further argue that seeing depth in a two-line stereogram of opposite contrast can be explained.

Nakazimo and Kondo(1988) investigated the similarity with the "wallpaper phenomenon". Nakazimo, Shimono and Kondo (1988) investigated the double nail illusion in Panum's limiting case and arrived at similar results as reported by Krol(1982).

== See also ==
- Binocular vision
- Directional vision
- Stereopsis
- Horopter
