= Münsterberg =

Münsterberg may refer to:

- Hugo Münsterberg (1863–1916), German-American psychologist
  - Münsterberg illusion
- Duchy of Münsterberg, a duchy of Silesia, existing from 1321/1322 to 1742
  - Ziębice (formerly Münsterberg), a town in Lower Silesia
