= Wundt illusion =

Geometrical-optical illusion

The Wundt illusion. The two vertical red lines are straight, but appear to bow inward due to the radiating background lines.

The Wundt illusion is a geometrical-optical illusion, a class of visual phenomena in which the perceived properties of simple lines or shapes differ from their true geometric properties. It was first described by the German psychologist Wilhelm Wundt in 1898.

The Hering illusion, in which straight lines appear to bow outward. This is the inverse of the Wundt illusion.

== Description of the effect ==
The two red vertical lines are both straight, but they may look as if they are bowed inwards to some observers. Even though the two red vertical lines appear bowed inwards to some observers, they are actually both straight. The distortion is induced by the radiating lines in the background, which intersect the vertical lines at acute angles, as in the Orbison illusion. The Hering illusion produces a similar, but inverted effect, in which straight lines appear to bow outwards rather than inwards; the Wundt illusion can therefore be understood as the Hering illusion's counterpart [3]. The effect is consistent across observers and persists even when observers are aware that the lines are physically straight. This quality, common to many geometrical-optical illusions, distinguishes such effects from misperceptions that can be corrected by knowledge alone. The distortion is greatest when the background lines intersect the vertical lines at angles between 10 and 30 degrees, and when there is an increasing rate of change in angle size from the ends toward the centre of the line.

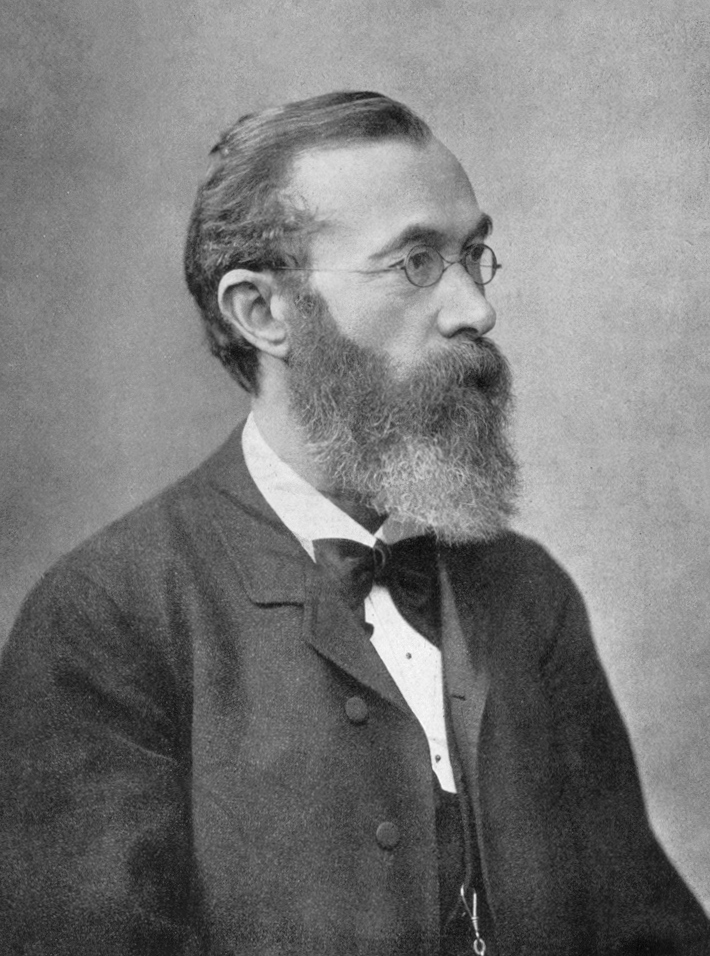
Wilhelm Wundt (1832–1920), who first described the illusion in 1898.

== Historical background ==
The Wundt illusion was first described by Wilhelm Wundt (1832–1920), a German physician and psychologist widely regarded as one of the founding figures of modern experimental psychology. Wundt published the illusion in 1898 as part of a broader investigation into geometrical-optical illusions. The illusion belongs to a class of geometrical-optical illusions that were described independently by several researchers during a concentrated period in the mid-to-late nineteenth century, including the Hering illusion (1861) and the Müller-Lyer illusion (1889).

== Theoretical explanations ==
Several hypotheses have been proposed to account for the distortion observed in the Wundt illusion. These are not mutually exclusive, and it is likely that more than one mechanism contributes to the overall effect.

=== Acute angle expansion ===
One prominent hypothesis holds that the visual system has a tendency to represent acute angles as larger than they physically are. In the Wundt illusion, the background lines intersect the vertical red lines at acute angles. The visual system enhances the orientation contrast at these points of intersection, effectively expanding the perceived angle. This causes the red lines to appear bent inward near the centre of the figure. Empirical support for the role of angle properties comes from Crassini and Over (1978), who found that the magnitude of the illusion is greatest when intersect angles are between 10 and 30 degrees and when these angles increase progressively from the ends of the line toward its centre, producing a cumulative shift in the line's apparent spatial direction at each successive point of intersection.

=== Lateral inhibition ===
A second hypothesis attributes geometrical-optical illusions to lateral inhibition, a neural process in which the activation of one neuron suppresses the activity of neighbouring neurons. It has been proposed that this mutual inhibition between spatially adjacent contours on the retina causes a displacement in their perceived positions. Coren (1999) tested this mechanism directly on the Wundt-Hering illusion by exposing participants to conditions designed to enhance lateral inhibitory activity and found that the magnitude of the illusion increased under these conditions. However, lateral inhibition is generally considered a contributing rather than a sole explanation for such illusions, since the effect persists even under conditions where direct contour interactions are minimised.

=== Directional biasing ===
Day and Kimm (2010) proposed that the Thiéry-Wundt illusion belongs to the same family as the Müller-Lyer illusion, in which inward-directed angles produce a systematic bias in the perceived extent of a spatial interval. On this account, the distortion arises from a process of directional biasing, in which the visual system misrepresents the spatial extent of regions bounded by converging or intersecting lines.

=== Evaluation of proposed mechanisms ===
Each of the three hypotheses accounts for some features of the Wundt illusion but none provides a complete explanation on its own. The acute angle expansion hypothesis is well-supported by the broader geometrical-optical illusions literature and is consistent with Westheimer's (2008) analysis of how the visual system processes orientation contrast, and receives direct empirical support from Crassini and Over's (1978) finding that illusion magnitude is systematically related to the specific angular properties of the background lines. The lateral inhibition hypothesis has the advantage of grounding the illusion in a well-established neural process, and Coren's (1999) experimental findings provide direct empirical support for its role in the Wundt-Hering illusion specifically. However, Coren himself concluded that lateral inhibition is a contributing rather than primary cause. The directional biasing account proposed by Day and Kimm (2010) is the most recent of the three and situates the Wundt illusion within a well-researched family of illusions, lending it broader theoretical support, though it was developed primarily in relation to the Thiéry-Wundt triangular variant rather than the classic line-bowing version of the illusion. It is likely that the full effect results from a combination of these mechanisms rather than any single cause.

== Relationship to debates in perceptual psychology ==
The Wundt illusion is of interest beyond its perceptual properties, as it bears on broader theoretical debates in psychology and philosophy of mind. The persistence of the illusion even when the observer knows the lines are straight is relevant to discussions of cognitive modularity and cognitive penetration. On a modular view of the mind, the visual system operates as a semi-independent processing unit whose outputs are not accessible to, or modifiable by, conscious belief. The fact that knowledge of the illusion does not eliminate it is consistent with the view that visual processing is, to some degree, cognitively impenetrable. The illusion has also been discussed in relation to the nature of perceptual experience. When experiencing the Wundt illusion, an observer can simultaneously know that the lines are straight and perceive them as curved. This has been taken as evidence against the view that perceptual states are belief-like, since holding contradictory beliefs simultaneously would ordinarily be considered irrational, yet experiencing this illusion does not appear to involve any such irrationality.

== Clinical applications ==
A variant known as the Wundt-Jastrow area illusion, in which two curved fan-shaped segments of identical size appear to differ in length, has been applied in clinical neuropsychology as a diagnostic tool for unilateral spatial neglect. Massironi et al. (1988) developed a test in which participants were shown the illusion with its determining features orientated toward either the left or right visual field. Patients with right-hemisphere brain damage who also had left-sided spatial neglect failed to perceive the illusion when its features were orientated toward the left visual field, whereas left-brain-damaged patients and controls showed normal responses. The test score correlated strongly with independent clinician ratings of hemi-inattention severity (Spearman r = 0.83), demonstrating its discriminative validity as a neuropsychological assessment tool.

== Related illusions ==
The Hering illusion, in which straight parallel lines appear to bow outward due to a background of radiating lines. The Wundt illusion produces the opposite effect and can be considered its inverse.

The Orbison illusion, in which straight lines or geometric shapes appear distorted when superimposed on a background of concentric circles or radiating lines, through a similar mechanism of contextual distortion.

The Müller-Lyer illusion, in which the perceived length of a line is altered by arrow-like fins at its ends. Day and Kimm (2010) argued that the Wundt illusion belongs to the same broader family of illusions as the Müller-Lyer, both being driven by directional biasing from inward-directed angles.

A further related phenomenon is the Horizontal–vertical illusion, which Wundt himself introduced as a variant of his original illusion in 1858. The two intersecting lines are equal in length although the vertical line appears to be much longer. The horizontal line needs to be extended up to 30% to match the perceptual length of the vertical line. This is not confined to simple line drawings, as this can also be seen in buildings, parking meters, as well as other things viewed in a natural setting.
