= Geometrical-optical illusions =

Type of optical illusion

Geometrical–optical are visual illusions, also optical illusions, in which the geometrical properties of what is seen differ from those of the corresponding objects in the visual field.

== Geometrical properties ==
In studying geometry one concentrates on the position of points and on the length, orientation and curvature of lines. Geometrical–optical illusions then relate in the first instance to object characteristics as defined by geometry. Though vision is three-dimensional, in many situations depth can be factored out and attention concentrated on a simple view of a two-dimensional tablet with its x and y co-ordinates.'

== Illusions are in visual space ==
Whereas their counterparts in the observer's object space are public and have measurable properties, the illusions themselves are private to the observer's (human or animal) experience. Nevertheless, they are accessible to portrayal by verbal and other communication and even to measurement by psychophysics. A nulling technique is particularly useful in which a target is deliberately given an opposing deformation in an effort to cancel the illusion.

== Categories of visual illusions ==
Mach bands = visual illusion of brightness (intensive property)

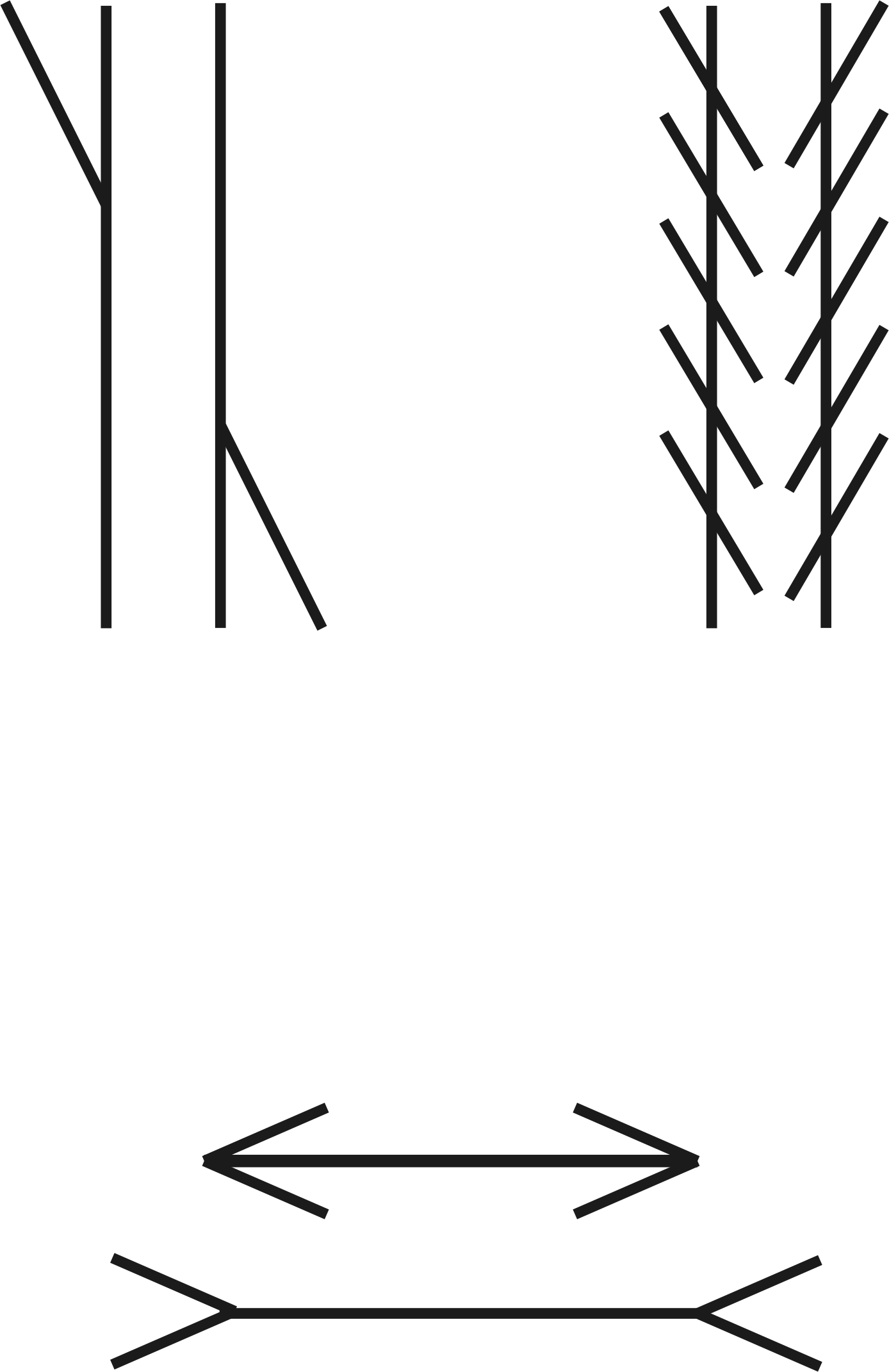
Illusions of position (Poggendorff), orientation (Zöllner) and, below, length (Müller-Lyer)

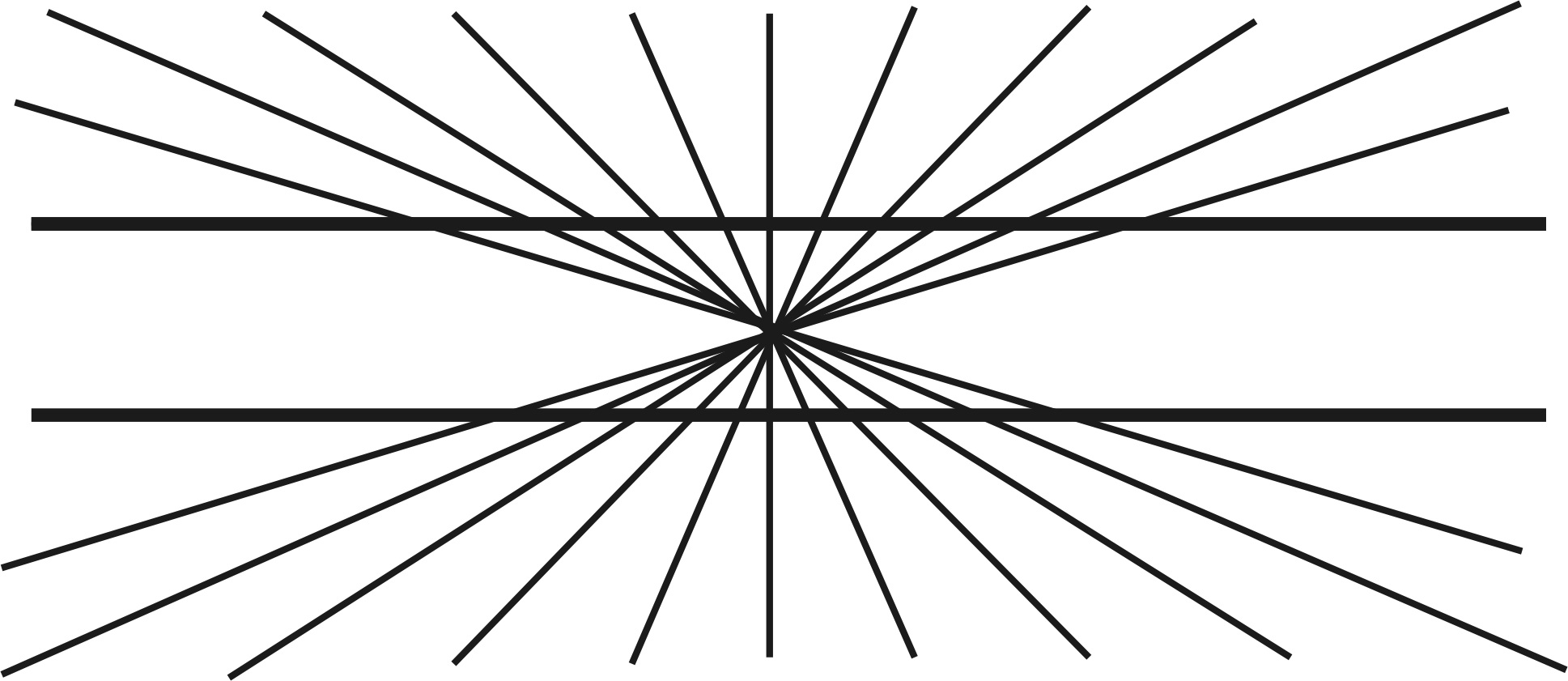
Hering Illusion of curvature

Delboeuf Illusion of size: left inner circle and right outer circle are actually equal

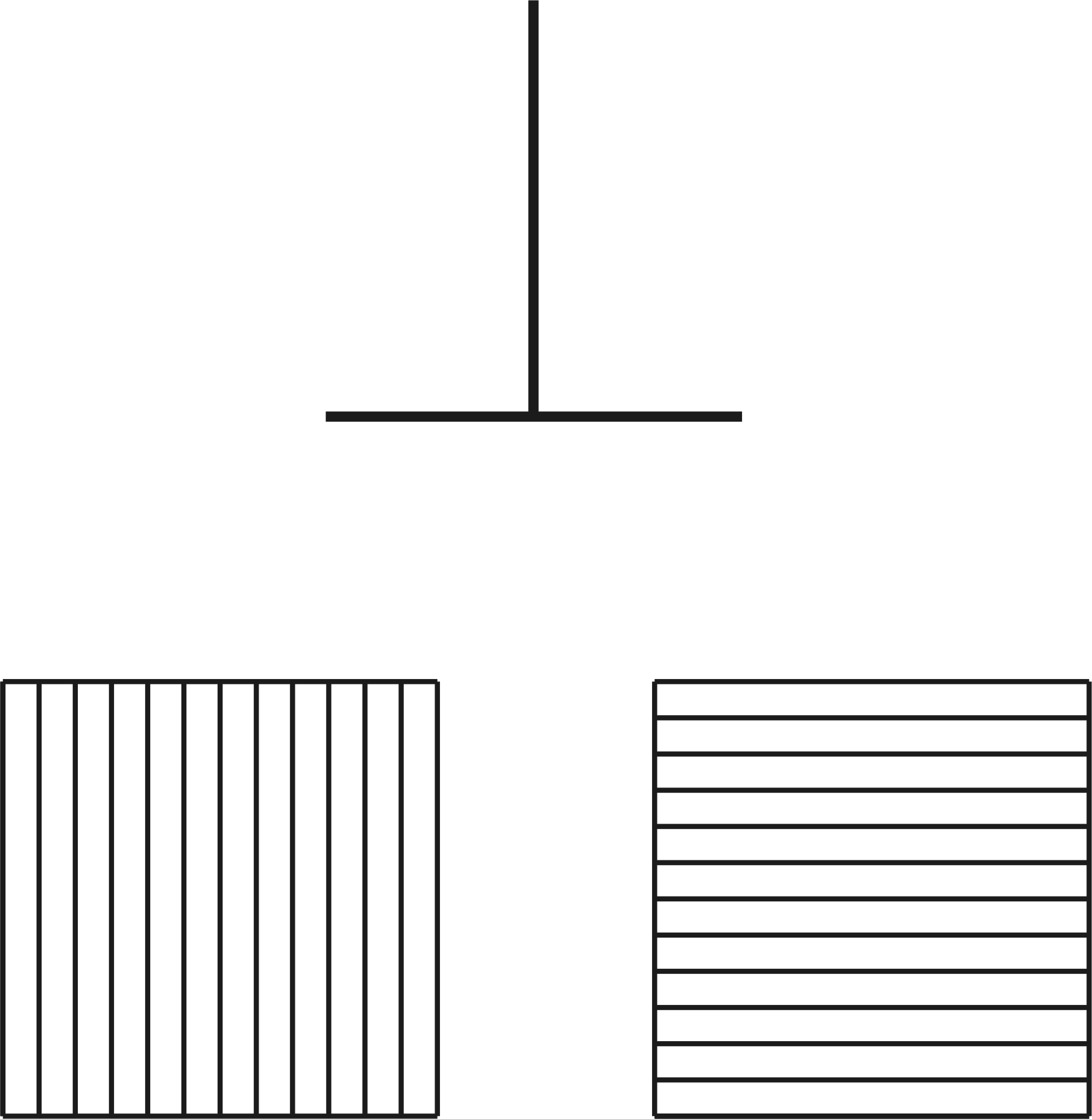
Vertical–horizontal illusion

Shifted-chessboard illusion

Visual or Optical Illusions can be categorized according to the nature of the difference between objects and percepts. For example, these can be in brightness or color, called intensive properties of targets, e.g. Mach bands. Or they can be in their location, size, orientation or depth, called extensive. When an illusion involves properties that fall within the purview of geometry it is geometrical–optical, a term given to it in the first scientific paper devoted to the topic by J.J. Oppel, a German high-school teacher, in 1854. It was taken up by Wilhelm Wundt, widely regarded as the founder of experimental psychology, and is now universally used. That by 1972 the first edition of Robinson's book devotes 100 closely printed pages and over 180 figures to these illusions attests to their popularity.

== Examples of geometrical–optical illusions ==
The easiest to explore are the geometrical–optical illusions that show up in ordinary black and white line drawings. A few examples are drawn from the list of optical illusions. They illustrate illusions of position (Poggendorff illusion), of length (Müller-Lyer illusion), of orientation (Zöllner illusion, Münsterberg illusion or shifted-chessboard illusion and its café wall illusion variant), of rectilinearity or straightness of lines (Hering illusion), of size (Delboeuf illusion) and of vertical/horizontal anisotropy (vertical–horizontal illusion), in which the vertical extension appears exaggerated.

== Related phenomena ==
Necker cube = reversible figure

Penrose triangle = unrealizable object

Kanizsa triangle = illusory contours

Visual illusions proper should be distinguished from some related phenomena. Some simple targets such as the Necker cube are capable of more than one interpretation, which are usually seen in alternation, one at a time. They may be called ambiguous configurations rather than illusion, because what is seen at any time is not actually illusory. The configurations of the Penrose or Escher type are illusory in the sense that only on a detailed logical analysis it becomes apparent that they are not physically realizable. If one thinks of an illusion as something out there that is misinterpreted, and of a delusion when a demonstrable substrate is lacking, the distinction breaks down for such effects as the Kanizsa triangle and illusory contours.

== Explanations ==
Explanations of geometrical–optical illusion are based on one of two modes of attack:

- the physiological or bottom-up, seeking the cause of the deformation in the eye's optical imaging or in signal misrouting during neural processing in the retina or the first stages of the brain, the primary visual cortex, or
- the cognitive or perceptual, which regards the deviation from true size, shape or position as caused by the assignment of a percept to a meaningful but false or inappropriate object class.

The first stage in the operations that transfer information from a visual target in front of an observer into its neural representation in the brain and then allow a percept to emerge, is the imaging by the eye and the processing by the neural circuits in the retina. Some components of geometrical–optical illusions can be ascribed to aberrations at that level. Even if this does not fully account for an illusion, the step is helpful because it puts elaborate mental theories in a more secure place. The moon illusion is a good example. Before invoking concepts of apparent distance and size constancy, it helps to be sure that the retinal image hasn't changed much when the moon looks larger as it descends to the horizon.

Once the signals from the retina enter the visual cortex, a host of local interactions are known to take place. In particular, neurons are tuned to target orientation and their response are known to depend on context. The widely accepted interpretation of, e.g. the Poggendorff and Hering illusions as manifestation of expansion of acute angles at line intersections, is an example of successful implementation of a "bottom-up," physiological explanation of a geometrical–optical illusion.

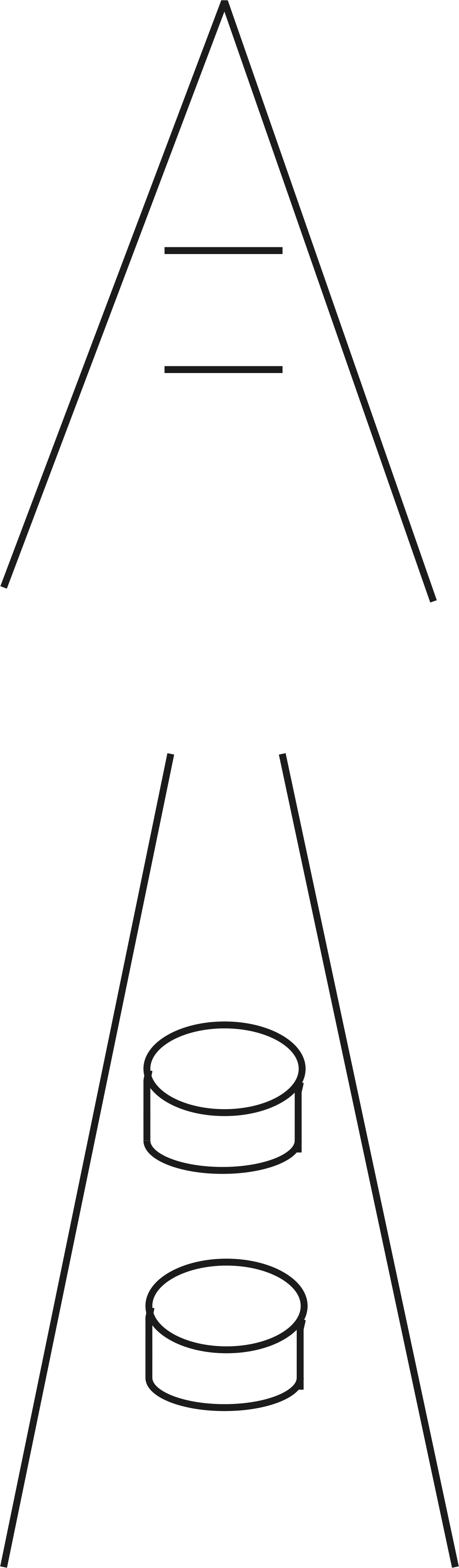
Ponzo illusion in a purely schematic form and, below, with perspective clues

However, almost all geometrical optical illusions have components that are at present not amenable to physiological explanations. The subject, therefore, is a fertile field for propositions based in the disciplines of perception and cognition. To illustrate: Instead of interpreting them as just a pair the sloping lines within which one feature is seen smaller than an identical one nearer to the point of convergence, the Ponzo pattern may be taken for a railroad track rendered as a perspective drawing. A barrel lying within the rails would have to be physically wider to cover the increased portion of the width of the track if it were farther away. The consequence is the judgment that the barrels differ in diameter, whereas their physical size in the drawing is equal.

A scientific study will include the recognition that a representation of the visual word is embodied in the state of the organism's nervous system at the time the illusion is experienced. In the discipline of experimental neuroscience, a top-down influence has the meaning that signals originating in higher neural centers, repository of memory traces, innate patterns and decision operations, travel down to lower neuronal circuits where they cause a shift of the excitation balance in the deviated direction. Such a concept is to be distinguished from the bottom-up approach which would look for aberrations that are imposed on the input in its path through the sensory apparatus. Top-down neural signaling would be a fitting implementation of the gestalt concept enunciated by Max Wertheimer that the "properties of any of the parts are determined by the intrinsic structural laws of the whole."

== Mathematical transformation ==
When objects and associated percepts, in their respective spaces, correspond to each other albeit with deformations describable in terms of geometry, the mathematically inclined are tempted to search for transformations, perhaps non-Euclidean, that map them on each other. Application of differential geometry has so far not been notably successful; the variety and complexity of the phenomena, significant differences between individuals and dependence on context, previous experience and instruction set a high bar for satisfying formulations.

== See also ==
- Visual illusions
- List of optical illusions
- Richard Gregory
