= Wilhelm von Bezold =

German scientist (1837–1907)

Johann Friedrich Wilhelm von Bezold
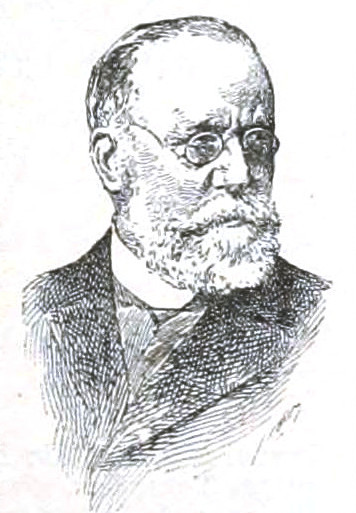
- Born: June 21, 1837; Munich
- Died: February 17, 1907 (aged 69)
- Occupations: Physicist, meteorologist
- Known for: Bezold effect, Bezold-Brücke shift

Johann Friedrich Wilhelm von Bezold (21 June 1837 – 17 February 1907) was a German physicist and meteorologist born in Munich, Kingdom of Bavaria. He is best known for discovering the Bezold effect and the Bezold–Brücke shift.

Bezold studied mathematics and physics at the Ludwig-Maximilians-Universität München and the University of Göttingen. He taught meteorology at the Ludwig-Maximilians-Universität München from 1861, becoming a professor in 1866. In 1868, he began teaching at the Polytechnic School of Munich. In 1875, he was named a member of the Bavarian Academy of Sciences.

From 1885 to 1907, he was director of the Prussian Institute of Meteorology at the Friedrich Wilhelm University of Berlin. As a scientist, he was mainly interested in the physics of the atmosphere, and he contributed much to the theory of electrical storms.

Bezold was one of the early researchers of atmospheric thermodynamics. He considered pseudo-adiabatic processes describing air as it is lifted, expands, cools, and eventually condenses and precipitates its water vapor.

It was Bezold's investigations of Lichtenberg dust figures that were useful to Heinrich Rudolf Hertz during his attempt to physically validate Maxwell's mathematical analysis of electromagnetic waves.
