= Invisible auditor =

The invisible auditor model is a variation of the invisible witness model.

== Overview ==
The invisible witness model was put forth by classical film theorists such as Hugo Münsterberg, V. Pudovkin, and André Bazin who wanted to "account for narration by claiming that editing mimicked the perception of an "invisible observer". This model presents the idea that the edits reflect the shifting perception of a "real witness" who moves around the space viewing the scenes. When watching a film, it's never shot strictly from the Point of view of the cameraman but it's shot from a series of different angles all around the scene jumping from first person perspective to bird's-eye view to give the perception to the audience that they can see as much detail and perspective of the scene as possible.

James Lastra takes this model and applies it to sound. Where the invisible auditor model states that the recording should produce a sound as though it were being heard from the best seat in the house. This can best be understood when talking about "sound fidelity"; the sound recorded or the sound output is as close to the sound of its origins. This created point of auditor, where sound was recorded as though it were being listened to by an invisible auditor from the best seat in the house. This is what music artists strive for in their recordings." This denotes that there is a linear relationship between input and output and that the notion of sound fidelity in a recording/reproduction system is an assessment of this transparency; a measure of how faithful the reproduction is to the original".
