= Hugo Münsterberg =

German-American psychologist (1863–1916)

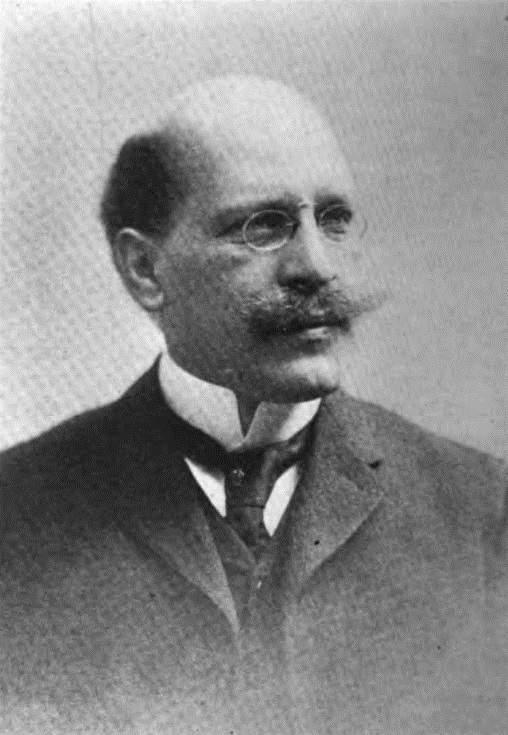
- Hugo Münsterberg
- Born: June 1, 1863; Danzig, Kingdom of Prussia
- Died: December 16, 1916 (aged 53); Cambridge, Massachusetts, U.S.
- Citizenship: German
- Education: University of Leipzig (PhD, 1885)
- Known for: Applied psychology Formalist film theory Münsterberg illusion
- Scientific career
- Fields: Psychology
- Workplaces: University of Freiburg; Harvard University
- Thesis: Die Lehre von der natürlichen Anpassung in ihrer Entwicklung, Anwendung und Bedeutung (1885)
- Doctoral advisor: Wilhelm Wundt
- Doctoral students: Edwin Holt
- Other notable students: Samuel Alexander, Mary Whiton Calkins, Morris Raphael Cohen, Richard M. Elliott, William Moulton Marston

Signature
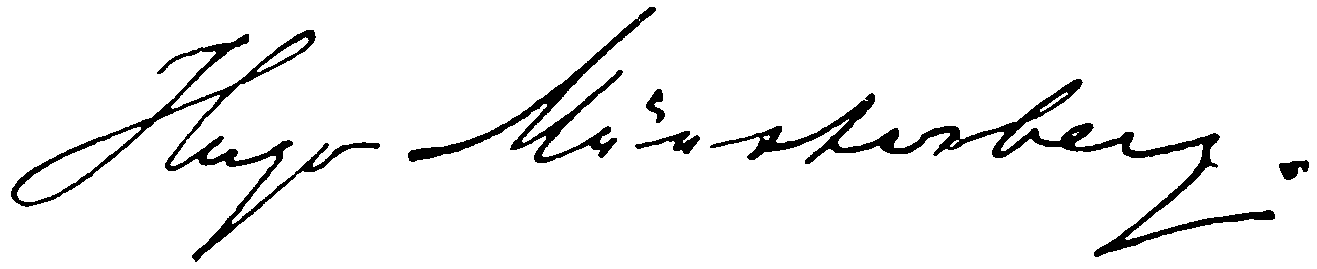

Hugo Münsterberg (/ˈmʊnstərbɜːrɡ/; German: [ˈmʏnstɐbɛʁk]; June 1, 1863 – December 16, 1916) was a German-American psychologist. He was one of the pioneers in applied psychology, extending his research and theories to industrial/organizational (I/O), legal, medical, clinical, educational and business settings. Münsterberg experienced immense turmoil with the outbreak of the First World War. Torn between his loyalty to the United States and his homeland, he often defended Germany's wartime actions, and was ostracized at Harvard.

== Biography ==
=== Early life ===
Hugo Münsterberg was born into a merchant family in Danzig, Prussia (now Gdansk, Poland), then a port city in West Prussia. Münsterberg's family was Jewish, a heritage with which he felt no connection and would barely ever manifest publicly. His father Moritz (1825–1880), was a successful lumber merchant and his mother, Minna Anna Bernhardi (1838–1875), a recognized artist and musician, was Moritz's second wife. Moritz had two sons with his first wife, Otto (1854–1915) and Emil (1855–1915), and two with Anna, Hugo (1863–1916) and Oscar (1865–1920). The four sons remained close, and all of them became successful in their careers. A neo-Renaissance villa in Detmold, Germany, that Oscar lived in from 1886 to 1896 has recently been renovated and opened as a cultural center.

The family had a great love of the arts, and Münsterberg was encouraged to explore music, literature, and art. Both his mother and his father died before he was 20 years old. When Münsterberg was 12, his mother died, transforming him from a care-free child to a much more serious young man. In 1880, his father also died.

=== Education and career ===
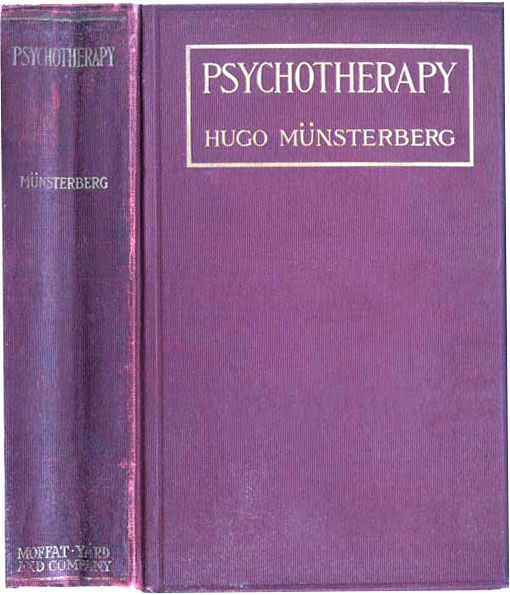
Cover of Psychotherapy by Münsterberg

Münsterberg had many interests in his early years, including art, literature, poetry, foreign languages, music, and acting. Münsterberg's first years of school were spent at the Gymnasium of Danzig from which he graduated in 1882. He entered the University of Leipzig in 1883 where he heard a lecture by Wilhelm Wundt and became interested in psychology. Münsterberg eventually became Wundt's research assistant. He received his PhD in physiological psychology in 1885 under Wundt's supervision at the age of 22. In 1887, Münsterberg received his medical degree at the University of Heidelberg. He also wrote a third thesis there and met the university's other criteria for habilitation enabling him to lecture as a Privatdozent. While in Freiburg he started a psychology laboratory and began publishing papers on a number of topics including attentional processes, memory, learning, and perception. In the same year he married a distant cousin, Selma Oppler of Strassburg, on August 7.

In 1889, he was promoted to assistant professorship and attended the First International Congress of psychology where he met William James. They kept up a frequent correspondence and in 1892, James invited him to Harvard for a three-year term as a chair of the psychology lab even though Münsterberg did not speak English at the time. He learned to speak English rather quickly and as a result his classes became very popular with students, in fact he was attracting students from James's classes. Part of the responsibilities he assumed as part of his new position at Harvard was that he became the supervisor of the psychology graduate students, in this position directed their dissertation research. As a result, he had a great influence of many students including Mary Whiton Calkins. In 1895 he returned to Freiburg due to uncertainties of settling in the United States. However, because he could not obtain an academic position that he wanted, he wrote James and requested his old position back so that he could return to Harvard, which he did in 1897.. However, he never could separate himself from his homeland.

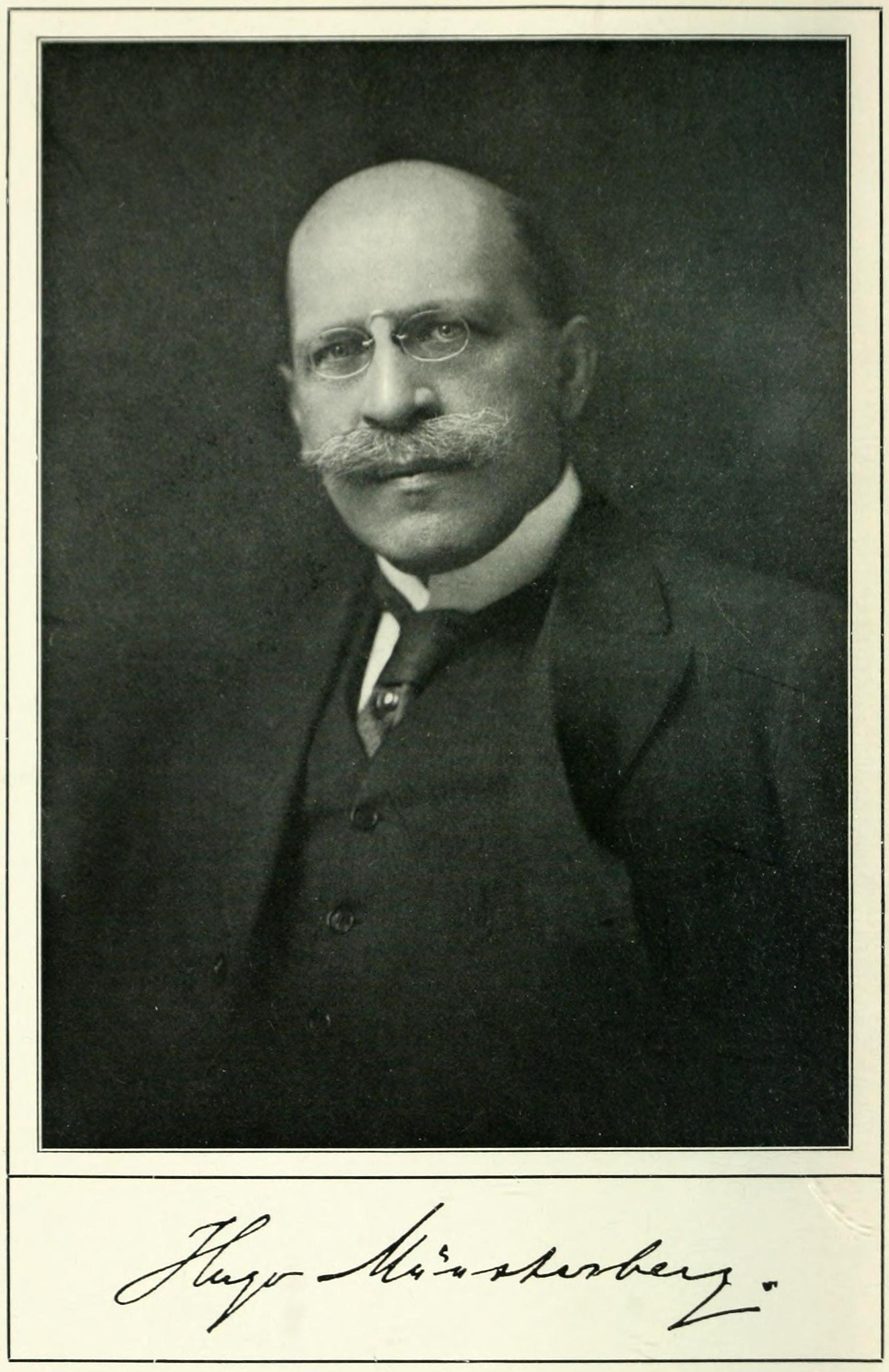
Hugo Münsterberg.

While at Harvard, Münsterberg's career was going very well. He was affiliated with many organizations including the American Psychological Association of which he became president (1898), the American Philosophical Association of which he also became president (1908), the Washington Academy, and the American Academy of Arts and Sciences. He was the organizer and vice-president of the International Congress of Arts and Sciences at the Saint Louis World's Fair of 1904, vice-president of the International Psychological Congress in Paris in 1900, and vice-president of the International Philosophical Congress in Heidelberg in 1907.

In 1910–1911, he was appointed exchange professor from Harvard to the University of Berlin. During that year, he founded the Amerika-Institut in Berlin. During his whole stay in the United States, he worked for the improvement of the relations between the United States and Germany, writing in the United States for a better understanding of Germany and in Germany for a higher appreciation of the United States.

Because of his work in applied psychology, Münsterberg was well known to the public, academic world, and scientific community. The outspoken views of Münsterberg on the issues of the upcoming First World War raised storms of controversy about his ideals and position. He appeared as probably the most eminent supporter of German policies in the United States. American supporters of France and Britain attacked him.

At his death, the general attitude toward Münsterberg had changed, and his death went relatively unnoticed because of his pro-German attitudes and his support of German policies. He tried to talk about the inaccurate stereotypes held by both the Germans and Americans. He wrote many books and articles attempting to correct them including The Americans (1904). As the war approached, Münsterberg's support of the supposed efficiency and modernity of the German autocracy caused him to be suspected of being a German spy, and many Harvard colleagues disassociated themselves from him. There were also threats against his life. He remained at Harvard as a professor of experimental psychology and director of the Psychological Laboratory until his sudden death in 1916 from an intracerebral hemorrhage in a lecture at Radcliffe College.

== Scholarship ==
=== Comparisons to Wundt and James ===
One major point of disagreement between Wundt and Münsterberg was their opposing views on how psychology should be practiced. For Wundt psychology should be a pure science detached from practical concerns, while Münsterberg wanted to apply psychological principles that could be applied to practical concerns. While working as Wundt's research assistant, Münsterberg studied voluntary activities through introspection, but they disagreed on the fundamental principles. Wundt believed that free will could be experienced as a conscious element of the mind during introspection, while Münsterberg did not. Münsterberg believed that as we prepare to act we consciously experience this bodily preparedness and mistakenly interpret it with the will to act a certain way. Münsterberg's beliefs support his interpretation of James's ideo-motor theory of behavior. For Münsterberg behavior causes ideas. However, for James ideas cause behavior. There are also similarities between James's theory of emotion and Münsterberg's analysis of voluntary behavior. For the James-Lange theory of emotion, "emotions are by-products of bodily reactions elicited by a situation." Whereas for Münsterberg "the feeling of willful actions results from an awareness of covert behavior, or a readiness to act overtly, elicited by a situation." In both cases, conscious experience is the result of behavior.

In 1900 he published the Basics of Psychology which he dedicated to James. Later Münsterberg became unhappy with James's liberal attitude towards philosophy and psychology. He was unhappy about James's acceptance of Freudian psychoanalysis, psychic phenomena, and religious mysticism into the area of psychology. Münsterberg had said "Mysticism and mediums were one thing, psychology was quite another. Experimental psychology and psychic hocus-pocus did not mix."

=== Experimental psychology ===
Münsterberg made numerous contributions to experimental psychology, including discovering a visual illusion that is now named after him.

=== Applied psychology ===
Over time Münsterberg's interests turned to the many practical applications of psychological principles, he felt very strongly that psychologists had the responsibility to uncover information that could then be used in real world applications. In fact he was the first to apply psychological principles to the legal field, creating forensic psychology. He wrote several papers on the application of psychological information in legal situations. The main objective in most of these articles was eyewitness testimony which examined the viability of said witness testimony. He also applied psychological principles to the field of clinical psychology attempting to help those who are ill through a variety of different treatments.

=== Forensic psychology ===
Münsterberg studied eyewitness testimonies in 1906 when he got involved in a Chicago murder case. Richard Ivens was sentenced to death for killing a woman. Sources suggest that Ivens was likely intellectually disabled and a local psychologist, J. Sanderson Christison, believed the confession was a result of hypnotic suggestion and he contacted Münsterberg and William James. After examining the evidence, Münsterberg concluded that dissociation and auto suggestion created Ivens false conviction and similar influences may have been the cause of many more. He recognized that psychology could inform the criminal justice process and set out to develop forensic psychology. In 1908, Münsterberg published his controversial book On the Witness Stand (1908), which is a collection of magazine articles previously published by him where he discusses the many different psychological factors that can change a trial's outcome and pointed the way for rational and scientific means for probing the facts claimed by human witnesses by the application of experimental psychology to the administration of law. He is also credited with being among the first to consider jury research. He says "The lawyer alone is obdurate. The lawyer and the judge and the juryman are sure that they do not need the experimental psychologist... They go on thinking that their legal instinct and their common sense supplies them with all that is needed and somewhat more... Just in the line of the law it therefore seems necessary not to rely simply on the technical statements of scholarly treatises, but to carry the discussion in the most popular form possible before the wider tribunal of the general reader" cementing his position that while the lawyer, judge, and the jurymen are confident in their abilities, that with the use of experimental psychology he can show just how flawed their thinking can really be.

Münsterberg points out the various reasons why eyewitness testimony is inherently unreliable. He describes how eyewitness testimony is inherently susceptible to what he calls "illusions" where a subject's perceptions could be affected by the circumstances, making their memory of the events that transpired or testimony inaccurate. He states that with regularity the testimony between two different individuals in the same circumstances can be radically different, even when neither of whom had the slightest interest in changing the facts as remembered. Münsterberg believes this is because memory, when all things are equal, is easily fallible. Because one's memory is affected by the associations, judgments, and suggestions that penetrate into every one of one's observations and taint our memory and our recollection of events.

Less well known but highly prescient, Münsterberg wrote about "Untrue Confessions." Appreciating the intuitive credibility of confession evidence in court, he expressed concern that confessions were fallible and speculated as to the psychological causes of false confessions.

Münsterberg conducted many experiments with his normal psychology students in his basic psychology course while at Harvard. He asked them, "without any theoretical introduction, at the beginning of an ordinary lecture, to write down careful answers to a number of questions referring to that which they would see or hear", and urged them "to do it as conscientiously and carefully as possible." The procedure went as follows. First he would show them a large sheet of white cardboard with a certain number of black dots on it spread in an irregular order. He exposed it for the students to view for only five seconds, and then asked them how many black dots that they thought were on the sheet. The results were surprising in that even with "highly trained, careful observers, whose attention was concentrated on the material, and who had full time for quiet scrutiny... there were some who believed that they saw seven or eight times more points than some other saw." He conducted similar experiments that referred to the perception of time, how rapidity is estimated, descriptions of sounds, and other similar experiments with similar results. Based on the results of his experiments, he "warned against the blind confidence in the observations of the average normal man" and concluded that one cannot rely on the accuracy of a normal person's memory. He questioned how one could be sure of the testimony of any given witness.

In a portion of the book which he calls "The Detection of Crime" he discusses the many factors that can influence testimony, gain confessions, and force a confession from those who are innocent. Münsterberg states that "brutality is still a favorite method of undermining the mental resistance of the accused." He discusses some of the ways that police of the time have of making suspects confess to crimes that they had not committed, including making the prisoner's life as uncomfortable as possible, to break down his or her energy, and "worst of all giving brutal shocks given with fiendish cruelty to the terrified imagination of the suspect." He states "that the method is ineffective in bringing out the real truth. At all times, innocent men have been accused by the tortured ones, crimes which were never committed have been confessed, infamous lies have been invented, to satisfy the demands of the torturers."

For years his groundbreaking work was not given the recognition it deserved in forensic psychology and other fields but more recent scholarship highlights his substantial contribution to these fields.

=== Clinical psychology ===
Münsterberg was grounded on the theory of psychophysical parallelism which argued that all physical processes had a parallel brain process. He believed that certain mental (neurological) illnesses have a cellular-metabolic causation and diagnosed based on his behavioristic observations of the subject's reactions to interviews of them by him. Psychotherapy (1909), the book he authored in regard to his investigations of matters of the mind. He defined psychotherapy as "the practice of treating the sick by influencing the mental life... perhaps with drugs and medicines, or with electricity or baths or diet."

When trying to understand the causes of abnormal behavior, he saw many mentally ill people. Because he was seeing them for scientific reasons, he chose not to charge them for his services and attempted to understand the causes of abnormal behavior. His treatment, which he applied mainly to cases of alcoholism, drug addiction, phobia, and sexual dysfunction, was basically instilling in his patients the idea that they could expect to improve as a result of their efforts. He also employed reciprocal antagonism which is when you strengthen thoughts opposite of the behavior that is causing the problems. Münsterberg did not believe that psychosis could be treated because he believed that was caused by deterioration of the nervous system.

=== Industrial psychology ===
Münsterberg was an admirer of Frederick Winslow Taylor to whom he wrote in 1913: "Our aim is to sketch the outlines of a new science, which is to intermediate between the modern laboratory psychology and the problem of economics." Industrial psychology was to be "independent of economic opinions and debatable... interests." Münsterberg's works Vocation and Learning (1912) and Psychology and Industrial Efficiency (1913) are usually considered the beginning of what would later become known as industrial psychology. His books dealt with many topics including hiring workers who had personalities and mental abilities best suited to certain types of vocations as the best way to increase motivation, performance, and retention. In addition his books also dealt with methods of increasing work efficiency, marketing, and advertising techniques. His paper "Psychology and the Market" (1909) suggested that psychology could be used in many different industrial applications including management, vocational decisions, advertising, job performance and employee motivation.

In Psychology and Industrial Efficiency (1913) Münsterberg addressed many different topics that are very important to the current field of industrial psychology. His objective was "to sketch the outlines of a new science which is to intermediate between the modern laboratory psychology and the problems of economics: the psychological experiment is systematically to be placed at the service of commerce and industry." He selects three points of view that he believes are of particular importance to industrial psychology and seeks to answer those questions. These three questions include "how we can find the men whose mental qualities make them best fitted for the work which they have to do; secondly, under what psychological conditions we can secure the greatest and most satisfactory output of work from every man; and finally, how we can produce most completely the influences on human minds which are desired in the interest of business." In other words, we ask how to find "the best possible man, how to produce the best possible work, and how to secure the best possible effects."

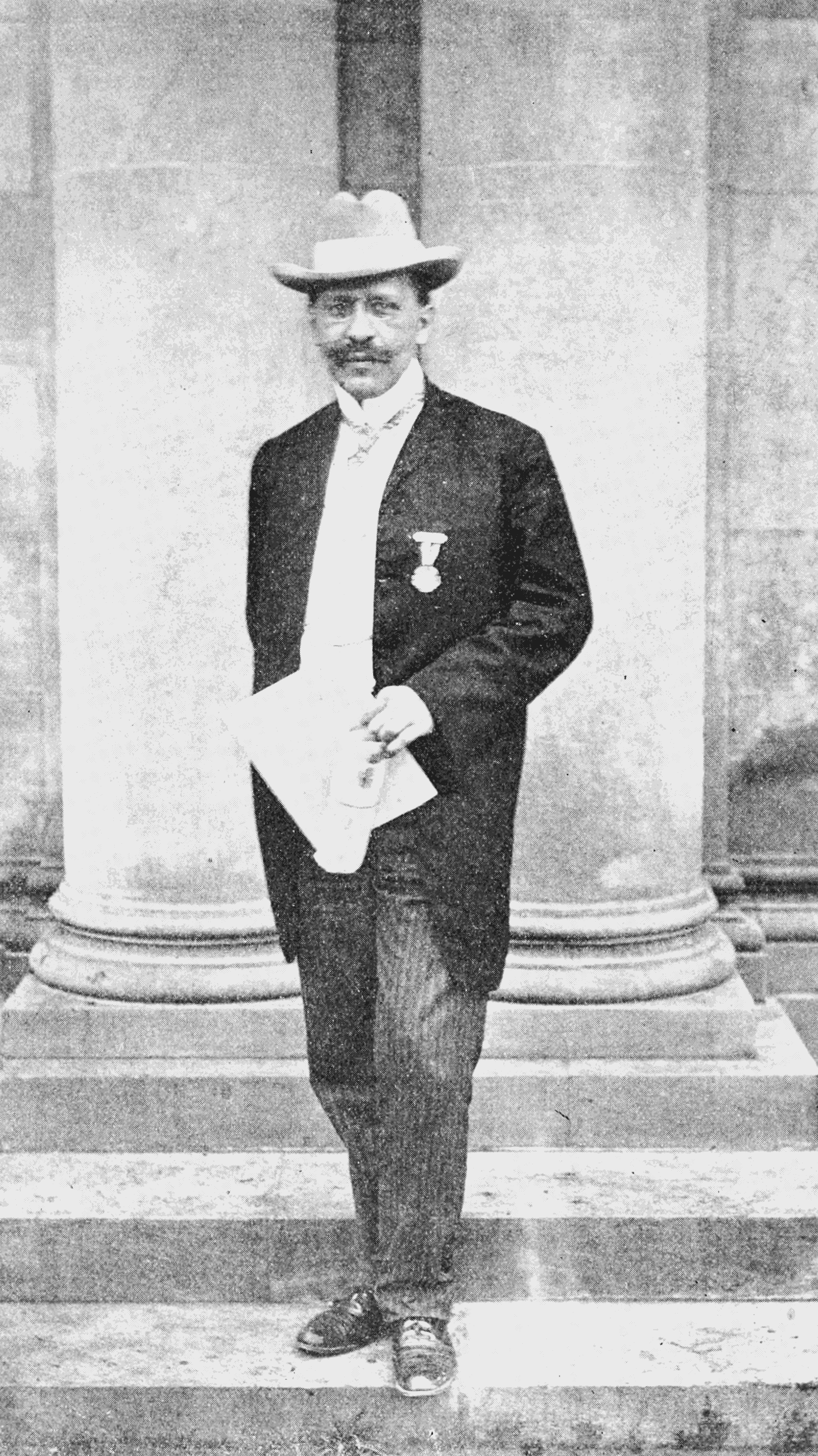
Hugo Münsterberg.

To Münsterberg the most pressing question was the "selection of those personalities which by their mental qualities are especially fit for a particular kind of economic work." Basically fitting the person with the correct skill set with the correct position to maximize their productivity, and to select those that have "fit personalities and reject the unfit ones." He gives many reasons why it's difficult to select or place the correct person to any given vocation and says that certain qualities cannot be taken alone to determine a person's suitability for a position including their education, training, technical abilities, recommendation of previous employers, personal impressions of the person "the mental dispositions which may still be quite undeveloped and which may unfold only under the influence of special conditions in the surroundings; but, on the other side, it covers the habitual traits of the personality, the features of the individual temperament and character, of the intelligence and of the ability, of the collected knowledge and of the acquired experience. All variations of will and feeling, of perception and thought, of attention and emotion, of memory and imagination." That in reality having confidence in those prior factors is completely unfounded because he believes that "A threefold difficulty exists. In the first place, young people know very little about themselves and their abilities. When the day comes on which they discover their real strong points and their weaknesses, it is often too late. They have usually been drawn into the current of a particular vocation, and have given too much energy to the preparation for a specific achievement to change the whole life-plan once more. The entire scheme of education gives to the individual little chance to find himself. A mere interest for one or another subject in school is influenced by many accidental circumstances, by the personality of the teacher or the methods of instruction, by suggestions of the surroundings and by home traditions, and accordingly even such a preference gives rather a slight final indication of the individual mental qualities. Moreover, such mere inclinations and interests cannot determine the true psychological fitness for a vocation."

Münsterberg points out that wandering from one job to another is more common in America and notes that this does have certain advantages including "that a failure in one vocation does not bring with it such a serious injury as in Europe, but it contributes much to the greater danger that any one may jump recklessly and without preparation into any vocational stream." Therefore, he sought to find a psychologically scientific way of vocational guidance. He describes how two such systems have come to rise in America that attempt to guide young students as they leave school to their chosen vocation, and a newer system marked by a movement toward scientific management in commerce and industry.

This second newer system started in Boston and is essentially a form of career guidance for children. A member of the community would call a meeting of all the neighborhood boys who were to leave elementary school at the end of the year and discuss with them whether they had any reasonable plans for the future. It was clear that the boys knew little of what they wanted to do or what would be expected of them in the real world, and the leader was able to give them, especially in one-one-one conversations, valuable advice. They knew too little of the characteristic features of the vocations to which they wanted to devote themselves, and they had given hardly any attention to the question whether they had the necessary qualifications for the special work. From this experience an office "opened in 1908, in which all Boston children at the time when they left school were to receive individual suggestions with reference to the most reasonable and best adjusted selection of a calling. There is hardly any doubt that the remarkable success of this modest beginning was dependent upon the admirable personality of the late organizer, who recognized the individual features with unusual tact and acumen. But he himself had no doubt that such a merely impressionistic method could not satisfy the demands." Münsterberg identified three main reasons why this worked: first, because they analyzed the objective relations of the hundreds of different accessible vocations, as well as, the children's economic, hygienic, technical, and social elements that should be examined so that every child could receive valuable information as to the demands of the vocation and what opportunities could be found within that vocation. Second, that the schools would have to be interested in the question of vocational choice so that observations of an individual child could be made about their abilities and interests. And finally, what he believed to be the most important point, "the methods had to be elaborated in such a way that the personal traits and dispositions might be discovered with much greater exactitude and with much richer detail than was possible through what a mere call on the vocational counselor could unveil." Münsterberg believes that these early vocational counselors point towards the spirit of the modern tendency toward applied psychology, and that the goal can only be reached through exact, scientific, experimental research, "and that the mere naïve methods—for instance, the filling-out of questionnaires which may be quite useful in the first approach—cannot be sufficient for a real, persistent furtherance of economic life and of the masses who seek their vocations."

The question of selecting the best possible man for a particular vocation for Münsterberg comes down to making the process very scientific, trying to create tests that limit the subjectivity that is possible through more traditional techniques of introspection, and instead using measurements of one's personality, intelligence and other inherent personality traits to try to find the best possible job for every individual.

Münsterberg also explored under what psychological conditions that an employer can secure the most and highest quality output of work from every employee by looking at the effects of changing the work space environment, what can possibly effect workers production, problems of monotony in factory and other vocations that involve tedious repeated tasks and how to avoid these situation, studied attention and fatigue in the workplace, and the Physical and social influences on the working power.

Finally investigating how a company can secure the best possible effects in terms of sales. Münsterberg talks about ways to study the satisfaction of economic demands, experiments with discovering the effectiveness of advertisements, the psychology of buying and selling, and in the end discusses the future development of economic psychology.

== Women and education ==
Münsterberg's views on women were shaped by his views on biology. Though he firmly believed that women should receive where possible, a higher education, he felt that graduate studies were too difficult and demanding for them. As well, he suggested that women should not be allowed to serve on juries because they were "incapable of rational deliberation".

== Contributions to film theory ==
Both Dudley Andrew and James Monaco count Münsterberg's book The Photoplay: A Psychological Study as one of the early examples of film theory.

== Spiritualism ==
Though he believed in God and life after death, Münsterberg was throughout his career a committed opponent of parapsychology: the field of study concerned with the investigation of paranormal and psychic phenomena. He had a "great record of exposing mediums and other psychic charlatans".

A notable episode in this facet of his career involved his exposure of the fraudulent spiritualist medium Eusapia Palladino. The exposure was included in the chapter "My Friends, the Spiritualists" in his book American Problems from the Point of View of a Psychologist (1910). Author Daniel Cohen noted that "[Palladino] was undaunted by Münsterberg's exposure. Her tricks had been exposed many times before, yet she had prospered." The exposure was not taken seriously by Palladino's defenders. It was heavily criticized by Hereward Carrington and Théodore Flournoy.

On 18 December 1909, in New York, with the help of a hidden man lying under a table, Münsterberg caught Palladino levitating a table with her foot. Some investigators were originally baffled how Palladino could move curtains from a distance when all the doors and windows in the séance room were closed. According to Münsterberg she moved the curtains by releasing a jet of air from a rubber bulb that she had in her hand.

== Students ==
Münsterberg was an academic mentor to William Moulton Marston, creator of Wonder Woman.

== Works ==
Books

- Die Willenshandlung (1888)
- Beiträge zur experimentellen Psychologie (1889–92) Vol. 1, Vol. 2, Vol. 3, Vol. 4
- Psychology and Life (1899)
- Grundzüge der Psychologie (1900)
- American Traits from the Point of View of A German (1901)
- Die Amerikaner (1904)
- The Americans (1904)
- The Principles of Art Education (1905)
- The Eternal Life (1905)
- Science and Idealism (1906)
- On the Witness Stand: Essays on Psychology and Crime (1908)
- Aus Deutsch-Amerika (1908)
- The Eternal Values (1909)
- Psychology and the Teacher (1909, 1916)
- Psychotherapy (1909)
- American Problems from the Point of View of a Psychologist (1910)
- Vocation and Learning (1912)
- Psychology and Industrial Efficiency (1913)
- American Patriotism And Other Social Studies (1913)
- Psychology and Social Sanity (1914)
- Grundzüge der Psychotechnic (1914)
- Psychology, General and Applied (1914, textbook)
- The War and America (1915)
- Business Psychology (1915, textbook for La Salle Extension University, Chicago)
- Tomorrow (1916)
- The Photoplay. A psychological study (1916)

Articles

- Münsterberg, H. (1899). Psychology and Mysticism. Atlantic Monthly 83: 67–85.
- Münsterberg, H. (1910). My Friends the Spiritualists: Some Theories and Conclusions Concerning Eusapia Palladino. Metropolitan Magazine 31: 559–572.
- Münsterberg, H. (1907). Communicating with the Dead. New-York Tribune. November 3.
- Münsterberg, H. (1913). The Case of Beulah Miller: An Investigation of the New Psychical Mystery. The Metropolitan 38: 16–62.

== See also ==
- Invisible auditor
