= Catoptric cistula =

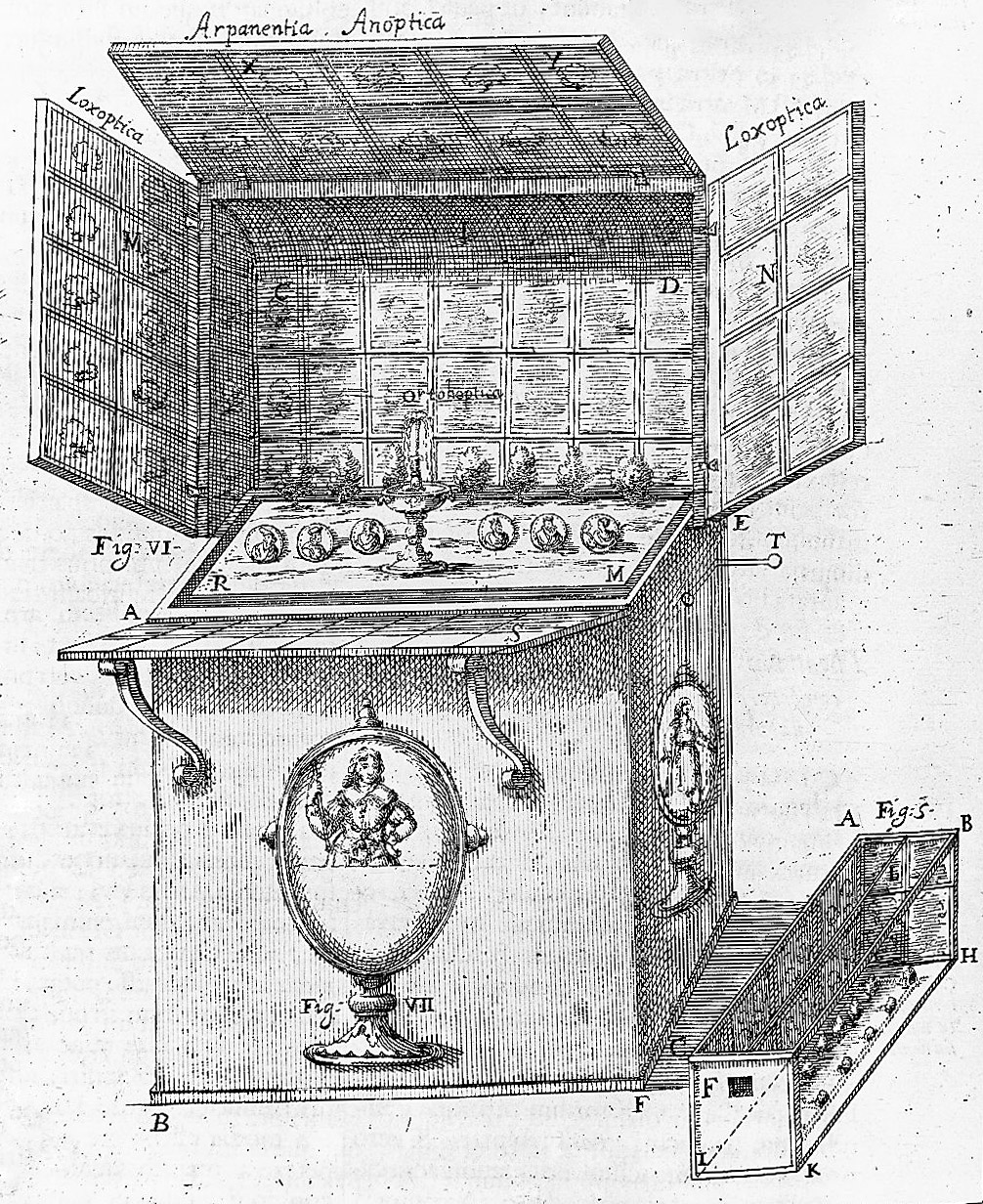
A complete catoptric theatre, opened to reveal the inside

A catoptric cistula, also called a catoptric theatre or chest, is a box with several sides lined with mirrors, so as to magnify or multiply images of any object placed inside the box. Of these, there are various kinds for various purposes, such as magnification, deformation, or multiplication of images.

The most elaborate catoptric chests known from Ancient Rome exhibited detailed scenes, including expansive libraries, forests, cities, or even vast treasures. Another form of entertainment involved placing an animal, such as a cat, inside a chest, and watching it interact with numerous other cats that appeared to surround it.

== Construction ==
=== Multiple scenes in one chest ===
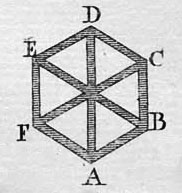

Following is an explanation of the construction of a catoptric cistula to represent several distinct scenes of objects, when looked in through several holes. Provide a polygonous cistula, or chest, in the shape of a multilateral prism ABCDEF, as shown in the figure, and divide its cavity by diagonal planes EB, FC, DA, intersecting each other in the center G, into as many triangular cells as the chest has sides; for example, a hexagonal chest will have six cells. Line the diagonal planes with plane mirrors. In the lateral planes, make round holes, through which the eye may observe cells of the chest. The holes are to be covered with plain glass, ground on the inner side, but not polished, to prevent the objects in the cells from appearing too distinctly. In each cell are placed the different objects, whose images are to be exhibited; then covering up the top of the chest with a thin transparent membrane, to permit light, the apparatus is complete.

By the laws of reflection, the images of the objects, placed within the angles of the mirrors, are multiplied, and some appear more distant than others, so that the objects of one cell will appear to take up more space than is contained in the entire chest. Looking through each hole will produce a new scene, each seemingly too large to be contained in the chest. According to the different angles the mirrors make with each other, the representations will be different; if the mirrors are at an angle greater than a right one, the images will be immense. (see anamorphosis)

=== One large scene ===
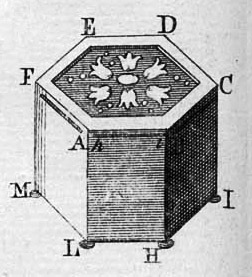

Following is an explanation of the construction of a catoptric cistula to represent the objects within it prodigiously multiplied, and diffused through a vast space. Make a polygonous chest, as before, but without dividing the inner cavity into any apartments or cells; see the second figure for an example. Line the lateral planes CBHI, BHLA, ALMF, etc., with plane mirrors, and at the apertures, scrape off the tin and quicksilver of the mirrors, so that the eye can see through. Place any objects in the bottom MI, e.g. a bird in a cage, etc.

Here, the eye looking through the aperture h i, will see each object placed at the bottom, vastly multiplied, and the images separated by equal distances from one another.

== In culture ==
The torture chamber in the Phantom of the Opera is a six-sided catoptric chamber:

We were in the middle of a little six-cornered room, the sides of which were covered with mirrors from top to bottom. In the corners, we could clearly see the "joins" in the glasses, the segments intended to turn on their gear; yes, I recognized them and I recognized the iron tree in the corner, at the bottom of one of those segments ... the iron tree, with its iron branch, for the hanged men.

The TARDIS of the television series Doctor Who is perhaps a modern expression, though fictional, of the effect sought to be created in the mind of the viewer of a catoptric chamber.

Jorge Luis Borges's Library of Babel is a universe which really is organized as an infinite matrix of repeating units, as it appears to be from the inside of a catoptric chamber.
