= Motion silencing illusion =

Visual phenomenon

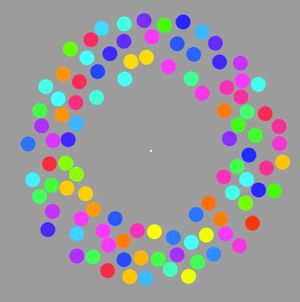
The motional silencing effect is observed when a pattern of dots like this one are rotated back and forth and changed in color, while the viewer remains focused on the central dot

Motion silencing is an illusion or perceptual phenomenon in which objects that are rapidly changing in a particular salient property seem to cease changing with motion. The illusion was first identified by Jordan Suchow and George Alvarez in the publication of their research on the topic.

It is a visual illusion in which a set of objects that change in luminance, hue, size, or shape appears to stop changing when it moves. It was discovered by Jordan Suchow and George Alvarez of Harvard University, and described in a paper published in Current Biology. Silencing won the Neural Correlate Society's "Best visual illusion of the year contest" in 2011.

== Overview ==
The original article by Suchow and Alvarez describes the phenomenon occurring when participants observe a series of videos showing one hundred small dots arranged in a ring shape around a central fixation point that change either in color, brightness, size or shape. These rings would alternate between phases of motionlessness and movement in a rotational back and forward motion. Participants are instructed to focus on the fixation point and adjust the rate of the changing properties in the stationary phase to match that of the moving phase. The faster the rotational movement, the slower the dots appeared to change. It has been inferred by the authors of the original study, as well as by others that have replicated the effect, that although the task involves motion in space and motion on the retina, it is the movement of the image across the retina that is responsible for the silencing effect. In the same study, Suchow and Alvarez required participants to complete a fixation-tracking task in order to assess whether Conversely, the illusory effect can be eliminated by moving the eye to follow the movement of the image or monitoring its changing properties specifically.

== Previous related research ==
Motion silencing stems from the study of change blindness which in essence is the failure to detect change in the visual field. The phenomenon has been studied extensively, by means of such methods as flicker tasks, forced saccade tasks, mudsplashes, disrupted and undisrupted scene transitions, incremental scene rotation, and videos. Research has demonstrated that people often fail to detect significant changes to images when the observer is not attending to the changing object fully, thus if attention is paid to the region where the change is occurring then change can be detected and the effect is forestalled. Even with attention observers sometimes fail to detect change due to incoherency in mental representations. In the case of motion silencing, the effect takes place in the peripheral vision, such that changes to the area around, but not at, the region of fixation is where change goes undetected. This inability to compare mental representations/perceptual information from one view to the next has inspired a number of explanations. The effect has been attributed to a general tendency to assume that the properties of objects or the features of a scene are stable, the idea that slight discrepancies between the expected scene and the actual scene are the result of malfunction in sensorimotor processes, or that the lack of saliency of a change when it is gradual fails to draw one's attention.

Following the theme of change going unnoticed, motion silencing was discovered as a type of change blindness. Since its discovery, the motion silencing phenomenon first tested by Suchow & Alvarez has been replicated in an attempt to further describe the nature of the effect and the mechanisms behind it).

It has been suggested that motion silencing is related to motion blindness, which is another perceptual phenomenon in which salient static objects appear and disappear when they are surrounded by a global moving pattern. In a study which assessed magnetic resonance images of the brain structures involved during motion-induced blindness found there to be activation in the ventral and dorsal pathways, specifically V4 of the ventral pathway and V3A, V3B, and the posterior intraparietal sulcus in the dorsal pathway. In the way that the dorsal pathway processes the moving pattern and in turn suppresses the ventral pathway's representation of the static salient objects, the same processes and patterns of activation may be found in the motion silencing illusion.

== Factors influencing motion silencing ==
Dot spacing has been found to influence motion silencing in terms of crowding, by causing dots and their accompanying alternating properties to merge due to their close proximity to one another and disallowing them to perceived in isolation. The silencing effect fails when a display contains limited stimuli and it appears that it is the distance between objects from their centers and not their edges that intensifies the silencing effect, and so it would follow that object size is of little importance. The critical spacing necessary for silencing to occur is roughly half the eccentricity of the rings in the display.

There is evidence that global motion factors into motion induced silencing also. Global motion is the movement of the entire image (in this case rotational) along with the circular trajectory that all the dots in the display adhere to, through rotational movement change signals can be hazed together, basically eliminating them. The motion threshold that was found to be required for silencing to take effect was 0.2 rotations per second whilst adhering to the parameters of the original experiments, and this threshold decreased as space between dots decreased, thus demonstrating the combined influence of crowding, global motion and velocity.

Suchow and Alvarez explain the role that velocity has on motion silencing in that local retinotopic (of the retina) detectors fixate on specific points in the visual field, and when they are only permitted a short amount of time to process the changes occurring they do not have enough time to detect changes. The effect of velocity explains why silencing is more potent with fast motion on the retina as opposed to slow motion.

Eccentricity, which is a mathematical constant conveyed in the form of a ratio and essentially describes to what degree a conic section deviates from being circular. Another variable that impacts motion silencing, eccentricity determines to what extent motion causes silencing. Choi, Bovik, and Cormack (2016) observed that when eccentricity in peripheral vision increases, motion silencing decreases.

== Theoretical explanations ==
Some theories have been proposed pertaining to instances of change detection failure, as in the case of motion silencing or change blindness. One such proposition is that of temporal freezing, which suggests that the observer retains the original image and its features without updating it as change occurs. The alternative explanation is that implicit updating is responsible for the effect. According to the implicit updating account, the observer is aware of the current state of the image, but not of the fact that it has changed. Suchow and Alvarez conducted an experiment in order to identify which theory best explained the motion silencing effect they had uncovered. They based their experiment on Hollingworth and Henderson's task where participants are required to view a picture of a room where the camera angle shifted incrementally. The picture then switched back to its initial position and participants responded with whether they noticed the change or not. Such an experiment, can provide support for either the temporal freezing explanation or the implicit updating account depending on the results. Hollingworth and Henderson found that participants did, in fact, notice the change, a finding that supports implicit updating given the fact that they evidently had a mental representation of the final image and when the camera reverted to original angle, they judged that it was different. This finding was replicated by Suchow and Alvarez in their adapted study and implicit updating in the currently accepted explanation for motion silencing.

== Extending the research ==
Although the discovery of the motion silencing illusion is relatively new, there has been some interesting research done looking to investigate the parameters of the effect. One study was conducted concerning whether silencing is exclusively caused by motion or whether it can be produced by other coherent visual changes such as in color or size. It was found that silencing can occur without motion or coherent changes. Another study sought to examine whether the motion silencing illusion generalizes to infants, specifically four-month-olds, to test the hypothesis that the mechanisms underlying the ability to integrate motion patterns of individual dots into coherent global motion to the extent that it hinders the perception of the dots’ colour changes would be developed by this early age. An infant's typical preference for changing colors was not observed once the rings of dots was sent into motion (following the stimuli used in Suchow and Alvarez's experiments). Instead, their attention was equally distributed between the two targets, changing and unchanging. Adults were included in the experiment for comparison purposes and they concluded that the mechanisms involved in the motion silencing effect operate for children as young as 4 months old also.

== See also ==
- Motion perception
- Motion sensing in vision
- Visual perception
- Optical illusion
- Change blindness
- Visual cortex
