= Dichoptic presentation =

Dichoptic (from Ancient Greek δίχα (díkha) 'in two' and ὀπτικός (optikós) 'relating to sight') is viewing a separate and independent field by each eye. In dichoptic presentation, stimulus A is presented to the left eye and a different stimulus B is presented to the right eye.

== Dichoptic moving images and games ==
Dichoptic perceptual training has been tested in order to stimulate the simultaneous use of both eyes. In recent years, efforts have been made to develop methods of perceptual learning in vision therapy for treating interocular suppression and improving binocular vision in patients with anisometropic or strabismic amblyopia.

In these methods, data has been presented within a virtual reality environment, and has also been presented using a computer screen or handheld device together with matched active or passive filter glasses for the user, which present a different image to each eye.

In order to balance the input of visual information from each eye to the brain, the data is presented in such a manner that the user needs to use both eyes to see the complete scene. Furthermore, the stimulus offered to the weaker eye may be stronger, for example with stronger contrast, than the stimulus for the stronger eye.

Some of these methods involve the use of dichoptic computer games (such as the game Tetris). A dichoptic presentation of popular movies has also been proposed.

== See also ==
- Cheiroscope

== Further references ==
- Dictionary of Optometry and Visual Science, 7th edition. (2009)
- Goldstein, E. B. (1989). Sensation and Perception. 3rd edition. ISBN 0-534-09672-7
- The Chambers Dictionary. (1993).
