= Stepping feet illusion =

Optical illusion

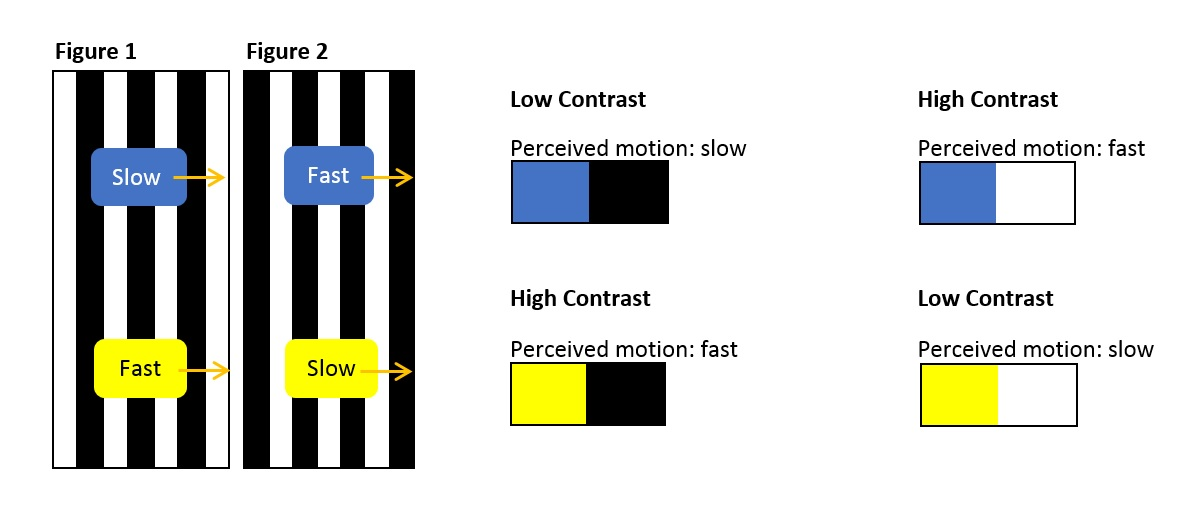
figure1 and figure2

The stepping feet illusion is a motion perception phenomenon involving two "buses," one blue and one yellow, moving horizontally across a "street" consisting of black and white stripes. Although both of the buses move at a constant speed, their perceived speed varies dramatically.

When the blue bus lies on the white stripes, the contrast is high (dark blue vs. white) and easily visible, so it appears to move faster than its actual speed. On the contrary, when the blue bus is against the black stripes, the contrast is low (dark blue vs. black) and harder to see, so the movement looks slower (see figs. 1 and 2). The opposite effects occur for the yellow bus. The two buses resemble a pair of moving of feet, giving the illusion its name.

Overall, the higher-contrast movements look faster than those with lower contrast. The effect disappears when the street's striped texture is removed because there is no contrast remaining, showing how an object's background can have a significant effect on its perceived speed.

Stepping Feet Illusion

== Historical background ==
The stepping feet illusion was initially demonstrated by Stuart Anstis in 2003. He proposed that the contrast effect was experienced by drivers in foggy conditions in which the difference in brightness between the car and its surroundings is generally less than a sunny day. As a result, people tended to misjudge that the speed of their cars was moving slower than the actual speed and felt that other cars were becoming less visible. While in foggy conditions, other cars were reduced in contrast, thus appearing slower than they really were.

== Causes ==
=== Contrast effect ===
Theoretically, the stepping feet illusion is influenced by the contrast between moving objects and their background. Contrast refers to the measured stimulus property of luminance differences. While the background has black and white stripes, the contrast changes from one line to the next. Both black and white lines have different patterns in contrast, for the dark object (blue bus), high contrast object against white lines and low contrast objects against black lines. In contrary for the light object (yellow bus), high contrast object against black lines and low contrast object against white lines. It is noted that not just any color can be paired for contrast, but there must be a luminance difference between the two, one of which must be bright, while the other must be dark.

=== Amplitude motion ===
Contrast not only modifies latency, but also the amplitude of perceived motion. Any difference in latency between different edges will move the diamond along the upright ellipse, but will not tilt the path from the vertical. Contrast modifies the perceived motion amplitudes of each side before edge motion coupled with boundary intersections. Contrast effects not only real smooth movement, but also stroboscopic clear movement. A blue bus and a yellow bus placed one on top of another, surging back and forth horizontally over a quarter of the square. Around the dark, yellow bus appears to jump through more distances, because they have a higher contrast. Around the light or white stripes, the blue bus seems to leap through a further distance, because now the square had a higher contrast. Here, contrast affects the apparent amplitude of motion, not its speed.

=== Visual codes for motion coding ===
Anstis considers the stepping feet illusion as a motion analogue of the Bezold–Brücke color intensity effect on color vision. Bezold–Brucke illusions may show the same scheme for motion coding, i.e. reflecting non-linearity in which a cone in one cone, or more likely in one colored path, increase faster with its luminance than the other. The contrast illusion depicted in the illusion of footsteps may be just the analogue movement of the Bezold–Brucke effect, when two hypothetical neurons are tuned respectively for fast and slow motion. At low contrast, the speed of a particular medium simulates both channels equally.

If the contrast (not the luminance) increases, then both fast and slow channels will increase their firing rate, ideally by the same amount. In the model, however, non-linearity creeps in, and the advantages of fast channels increase with more contrast than slow channel acquisition. As a result, at high contrast, the same medium speed as before stimulates discharge channels disproportionately over slow channels and the movement looks more quickly subjectively.

== Additional research ==
Jun On, Akiyasu Tomoeda, and Kokichi Sugihara (2014) won the best illusion of the year contest. They made a version of the "kickback illusion" which is closely related to the stepping feet illusion. In this illusion a rectangle moving at a constant speed in front of stripes generates apparent reverse motion, this apparent motion is similar to the action of a neck when the pigeon walks.
