= Hering illusion =

Geometrical-optical illusion

Hering illusion

The Hering illusion is one of the geometrical-optical illusions and was discovered by the German physiologist Ewald Hering in 1861. When two straight and parallel lines are presented in front of a radial background (like the spokes of a bicycle), the lines appear as if they were bowed outwards. The Orbison illusion is one of its variants, while the Wundt illusion produces a similar, but inverted effect.

There are several possible explanations for why perceptual distortion produced by the radiating pattern. The illusion was ascribed by Hering to an overestimation of the angle made at the points of intersection. If true, then the straightness of the parallel lines yields to that of the radiating lines, implying that there is a hierarchical ordering among components of such illusion. Others have suggested that angle overestimation results from lateral inhibition in visual cortex, while others have postulated a bias inherent in extrapolating 3D angle information from 2D projections.

A different framework suggests that the Hering illusion (and several other geometric illusions) are caused by temporal delays with which the visual system must cope. In this framework, the visual system extrapolates current information to “perceive the present”: instead of providing a conscious image of how the world was ~100 ms in the past (when signals first struck the retina), the visual system estimates how the world is likely to look in the next moment. In the case of the Hering illusion, the radial lines trick the visual system into thinking it is moving forward. Since we are not actually moving and the figure is static, we misperceive the straight lines as curved—as they would appear in the next moment.

It is possible that both frameworks are compatible. The Hering illusion can also be induced by a background of optic flow (such as dots flowing out from the center of a screen, creating the illusion of forward motion through a starfield). Importantly, the bowing direction is the same whether the flow moves inward or outward. This result is consistent with a role for networks of visual orientation-tuned neurons (e.g., simple cells in primary visual cortex) in the spatial warping. In this framework, under the common condition of forward ego-motion, it is possible that spatial warping counteracts the disadvantage of neural latencies. However, it also demonstrates that any spatial warping that counteracts neural delays is not a precise, on-the-fly computation, but instead a heuristic achieved by a simple mechanism that succeeds under normal circumstances.

Researcher Mark Changizi explained the illusion in a 2008 article:

"Evolution has seen to it that geometric drawings like this elicit in us premonitions of the near future. The converging lines toward a vanishing point (the spokes) are cues that trick our brains into thinking we are moving forward as we would in the real world, where the door frame (a pair of vertical lines) seems to bow out as we move through it and we try to perceive what that world will look like in the next instant."
