= Bezold effect =

Optical mixing of colors

Demonstration of the Bezold effect. The red seems lighter combined with the white, and darker combined with the black.

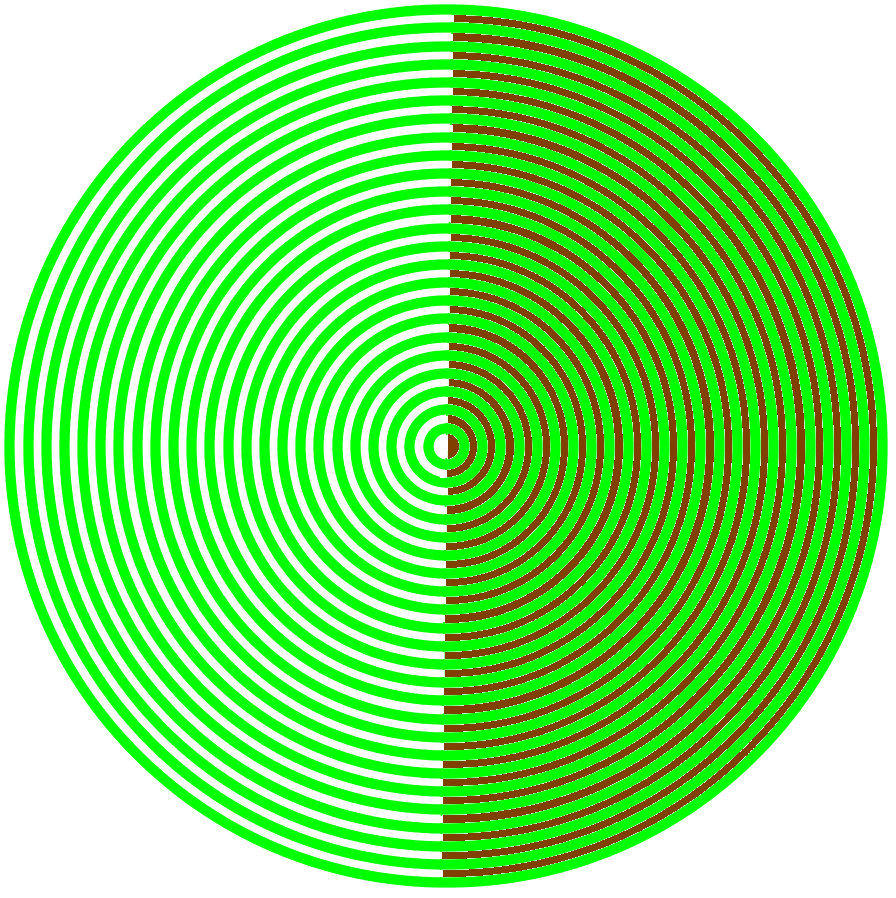
The green rings in the white surroundings of the left half appear lighter than in the brown surroundings of the right half.

The Bezold effect is an optical illusion, named after a German professor of meteorology Wilhelm von Bezold (1837–1907), who discovered that a color may appear different depending on its relation to adjacent colors. It was observed when Bezold was experimenting with ways to modify rug design by only changing one color.

It happens when small areas of color are interspersed. An assimilation effect called the von Bezold spreading effect, similar to spatial color mixing, is achieved.

The opposite effect is observed when large areas of color are placed adjacent to each other, resulting in color contrast.

== See also ==
- White's illusion
