= Fraser spiral illusion =

Optical illusion

Fraser spiral illusion

The Fraser spiral illusion is an optical illusion that was first described by the British psychologist Sir James Fraser (1863–1936) in 1908.

The illusion is also known as the false spiral, or by its original name, the twisted cord illusion. The overlapping black arc segments appear to form a spiral; however, the arcs are a series of concentric circles.

The visual distortion is produced by combining a regular line pattern (the circles) with misaligned parts (the differently colored strands). The Zöllner illusion and the café wall illusion are based on a similar principle, like many other visual effects, in which a sequence of tilted elements causes the eye to perceive phantom twists and deviations.

The illusion is augmented by the spiral components in the checkered background. It is a unique illusion, where the observer can verify the concentric strands manually. When the strands are highlighted in a different colour, it becomes obvious to the observer that no spiral is present.

== See also ==
- Op art
- Mathematics and art
