= Asahi illusion =

Optical illusion

Figure 1

Figure 2

Figure 3

Figure 4

The Asahi illusion (Japanese: asahi = morning sun) is an optical illusion that tricks the viewer into thinking a colour is much brighter than it truly is. It is based on a flower-like figure with petals arranged in a circle, which are very dark on the outside and become increasingly lighter in a gradient towards the middle.

== Description ==
The flowing coloring of the Asahi figure causes the inner part of its background to be perceived as significantly brighter than the outer background, causing the pupils to constrict when looking at the central background.

For optimal effect, all petals must have the same monochrome color scheme with changes in brightness. The background can be any uniform color, but it should be as light as possible.

The illusion disappears when all petals have the same color but without the smooth transitions.

== Research ==
The human brain causes the pupils to constrict in bright light. This pupillary reflex protects the retina from bright light and protects it from damage. A study showed a connection between visual perception and pupil size in the course of mammalian evolution.

Researchers at the University of Helsinki and the Max Planck Institute in Tübingen, with the significant collaboration of Nelson Totah, discovered the Asahi illusion while examining the brains and pupils of rats. The aim of these experiments was to learn more about the development of eyes in mammals. The evaluations led to the conclusion that the connection between visual perception and pupil size developed earlier than previously thought, since the Asahi illusion did not only cause a reaction in humans.

The results therefore provided further evidence of how similar the perception of humans and animals is.

== Literature ==
- Bruno Laeng, Tor Endestad: Bright illusions reduce the eye's pupil, Proceedings of the National Academy of Sciences of the United States of America, January 2012
- Yuta Suzukia, Tetsuto Minamia, Bruno Laeng, Shigeki Nakauchia: Colorful glares: Effects of colors on brightness illusions measured with pupillometry, Acta Psychologica, Volume 198, July 2019
- Dmitrii Vasilev, Isabel Raposo, Nelson Totah: Brightness illusions evoke pupil constriction preceded by a primary visual cortex response in rats in: Cerebral Cortex, Volume 33, Issue 12, 15 June 2023, Pages 7952–7959, https://doi.org/10.1093/cercor/bhad090, published 23 March 2023 by Oxford University Press (Oxford Academic)
