= Café wall illusion =

Optical illusion

The café wall illusion. The horizontal lines are parallel, despite appearing to be at different angles to each other.

The same image, with colors of lower contrast, no longer displaying the illusion

The café wall illusion (also known as the Münsterberg illusion or the kindergarten illusion) is a geometrical-optical illusion in which the parallel straight dividing lines between staggered rows with alternating dark and light rectangles (such as bricks or tiles) appear to be sloped, not parallel as they really are.

The phenomenon has been rediscovered several times. A version of the illusion was first described by Hugo Münsterberg in 1894, then described as the 'kindergarten illusion' in 1898 by A. H. Pierce, and under its current name in 1973 by Richard Gregory. According to Gregory, this effect was observed by a member of his laboratory, Steve Simpson, in the tiles of the wall of a café at the bottom of St Michael's Hill, Bristol.

In the construction of the illusion often each "brick" is surrounded by a layer of "mortar" intermediate between the dark and light colours of the "bricks".

In attempts at its deconstruction, the illusion was ascribed largely to the irradiation illusion (apparent greater size of a white area than of a black one), and the image disappears when black and white are replaced by different colours of the same brightness. But a component of the illusion remains even when all optical and retinal components are factored out. Contrast polarities seem to be the determining factor in the tilt's direction.

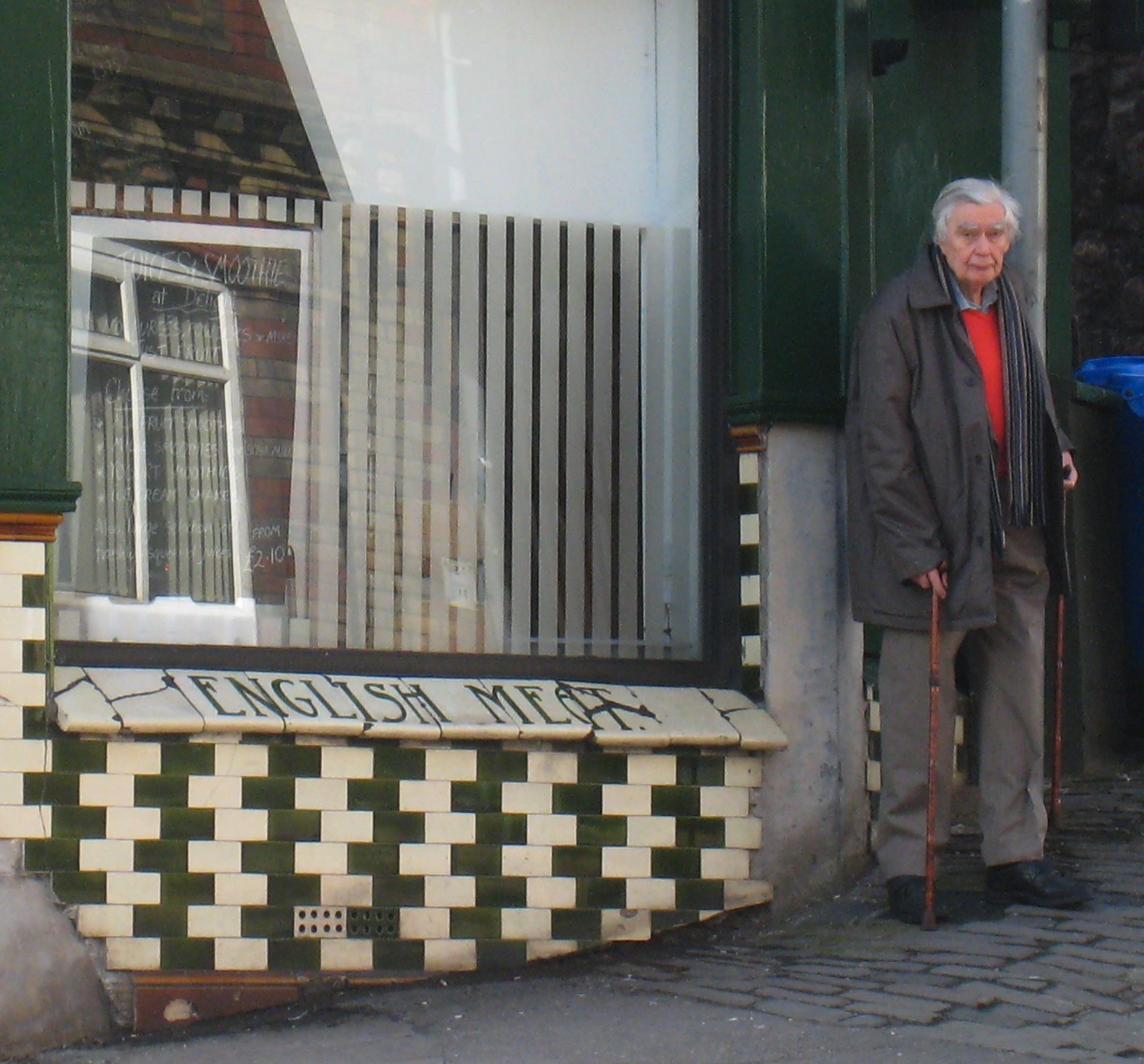
Richard Gregory visits the original café wall on St Michael's Hill, Bristol, in February 2010

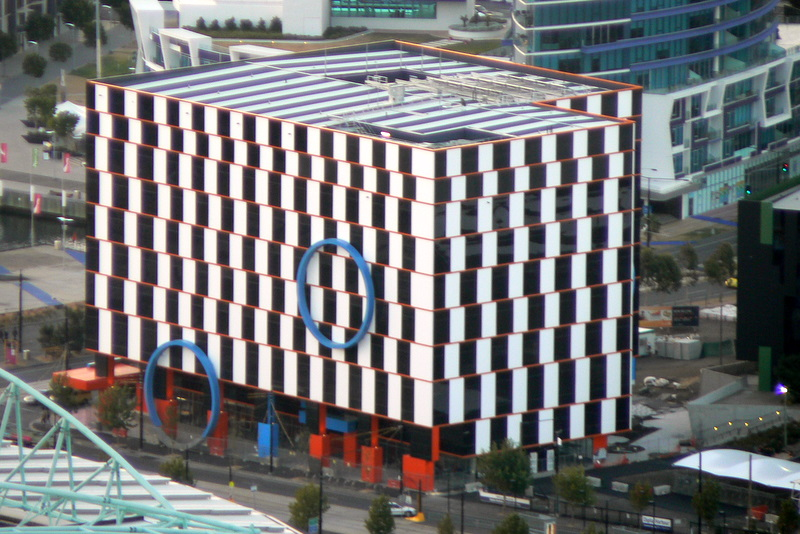
Architecture inspired by the café wall illusion, at Melbourne Docklands

Animated Cafe Wall Illusion

== See also ==
- Visual illusions
- Geometrical-optical illusions
