= Irradiation illusion =

Type of optical illusion

Example of an irradiation illusion

The irradiation illusion is an illusion of visual perception in which a light area of the visual field looks larger than an otherwise identical dark area. It was named by Hermann von Helmholtz around 1867; but the illusion was familiar to scientists long before then; Galileo mentions it in his 1632 book Dialogue Concerning the Two Chief World Systems. It arises partly from scattering of light inside the eye. This has the effect of enlarging the image of a light area on the retina.
