= Vertical–horizontal illusion =

Optical illusion

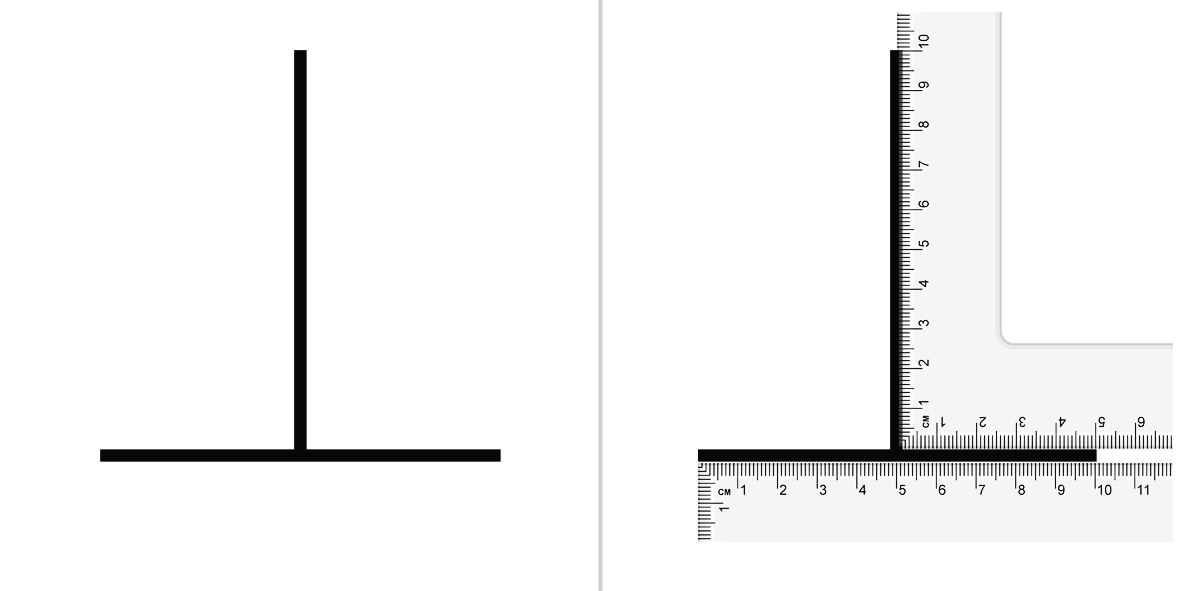
The vertical–horizontal illusion: despite appearances, the two lines are shown to be the same length

The vertical–horizontal illusion is the tendency for observers to overestimate the length of a vertical line relative to a horizontal line of the same length. This involves a bisecting component that causes the bisecting line to appear longer than the line that is bisected. People often overestimate or underestimate the length of the bisecting line relative to the bisected line of the same length. This even happens if people are aware that the lines are of the same length.

Cross-cultural differences in susceptibility to the vertical–horizontal illusion have been noted. People from Western cultures and people living in urban landscapes show more susceptibility than those living in eastern or open landscapes.

== Types of vertical–horizontal illusions ==
There are several different configurations of the vertical–horizontal illusion. The three configurations which seem to produce the highest illusion magnitude are the L configuration, the plus (+) configuration, and the inverted-T configuration. Of these three, the inverted-T configuration produces the highest illusion magnitude. When the bisecting line of the T illusion is configured horizontally, the illusion magnitude is lowered. However, when the bisecting line of the T illusion is configured vertically, the illusion magnitude is higher.

== Development ==
A gradual decrease in error of vertical–horizontal illusions occur as participants age increases from eight to fourteen years. Gough and Meschieri attribute this decrease in error to the child's improved ability to detect and de-center their attention in a visual display, i.e. position their body differently to gain other perspectives. Children who showed greater personal independence, verbal articulation, and visual scanning ability were more effective and resourceful in their ability to gauge vertical–horizontal illusions.

== Cross-cultural differences ==
Cross-cultural differences in susceptibility to the vertical–horizontal illusion have been noted in several studies. People living in developed urban cities show greater susceptibility than people living in rural areas. An explanation could be that those in rural areas are more accustomed to living in round houses on flat plains, or scrubland. Rural inhabitants have more exposure to distance and living on plains than people living in highly developed, commercialized cultures. However, differences in the strength of the vertical-horizontal illusion or the related Müller-Lyer illusion for these groups are inconsistent at best.

== Hemispheric neglect ==
Participants with hemispatial neglect had increased difficulty perceiving the equality of the lines on the vertical–horizontal illusion, in comparison with those in the control group. Montalembert's study, among others, gives claim to the notion that we perceive these types of illusions utilizing the left hemisphere of our brain.

== Gender differences ==
Gender differences have been found with regards to vertical–horizontal illusions. Rasmjou's 1998 study found men to outperform women in perceiving the vertical–horizontal illusion. The results of this variation could be from hemispheric asymmetries, and/or biological differences between men's and women's brains. Although women were found to have a higher illusion magnitude on vertical–horizontal illusion tasks, this does not mean men are better judges of distance than women, as there has been minimal research on this topic. Additional research is needed to draw a significant relationship between illusion magnitude and real-world tasks. These differences could also be due to social learning differences between men and women.

== Functional applications ==
Functional applications of vertical–horizontal illusion exist. Elliot et al. studied the effects of the horizontal and vertical illusion, and how the perceived illusion can influence visuo-motor coordination, i.e. motor activity dependent on sight. The study specifically focused on how the perceived height of a step, manipulated by the vertical and horizontal illusion, influenced stepping strategy as shown in toe elevation during step clearance. Their results showed an increased toe elevation in conditions where an illusion was perceived, leading them to conclude that there was a correlation between visual illusion and visuo-motor coordination. This can be implemented in the real world by developing better safety strategies in places such as nursing homes.

== See also ==
- Vertical–horizontal illusion (Wikiversity tutorial)
- Geometrical-optical illusions
