= Subjective constancy =

Constancy of perception

Subjective constancy or perceptual constancy is the perception of an object or quality as constant even though our sensation of the object changes. While the physical characteristics of an object may not change, in an attempt to deal with the external world, the human perceptual system has mechanisms that adjust to the stimulus.

== Visual ==
There are several types of perceptual constancies in visual perception:

Ponzo illusion: Top line is perceived as larger than the bottom line, though they are identical in size.

- Size constancy is one type of visual subjective constancy. Within a certain range, people's perception of one particular object's size will not change, regardless of changes in distance or the video size change on the retina. The perception of image is still based upon the actual size of the perceptual characteristics. According to optical principles, for the same object, the size of the image on the retina changes as the distance from the object to the observer changes. The greater the distance, the smaller the image is sensed by the retina. When someone is observing an object, although the distance of observation is different, the perceptional size is similar to the actual size. However, sensory and perception systems can be tricked by the use of illusions. Size constancy is related to distance, experience, and environment. Some examples of size constancy are Müller-Lyer illusion and Ponzo illusion. Another illusion experienced every day is the size of the moon – when closer to the horizon, the moon appears larger. See moon illusion. Human perception is largely influenced by the environment; that is, the context in which the object is found.
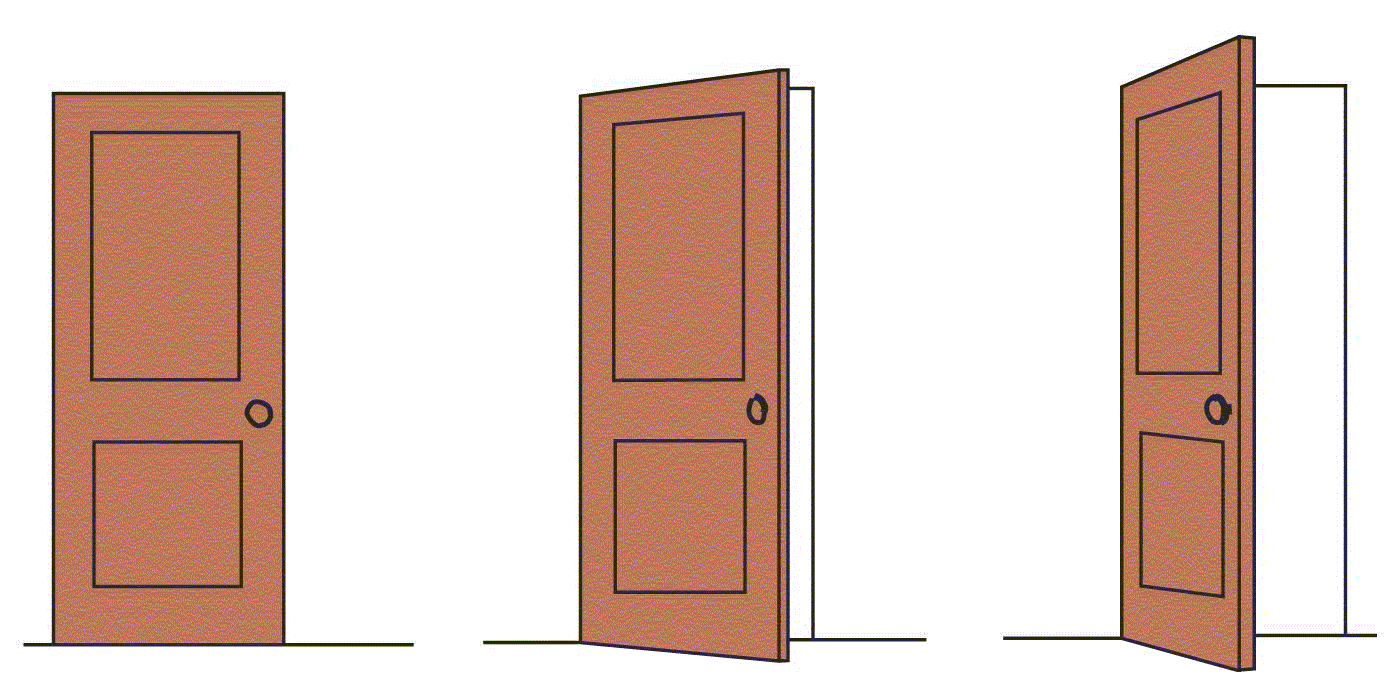
  Shape constancy: One would perceive the object to be a rectangular door opening but, if it were to be drawn out, it is in fact made up of varying shapes
- Shape constancy is similar to size constancy in that it relies largely on the perception of distance. Regardless of changes to an object's orientation (such as a door opening), the shape of the object is perceived the same. That is the actual shape of the object is sensed as changing but then perceived as the same. According to Kanwisher & associates, the localized part of the brain responsible for this is the extrastriate cortex.
- Color constancy is a feature of the human color perception system which ensures that the color of an object remains similar under varying conditions and is the result of a very complicated 'calculation' by an unconsciously working mechanism within the central nervous system.

The facts behind color-constancy phenomena...are that we require fine color discriminations less frequently than gross discriminations, and when gross discriminations enable us to maintain focus on objects of prime interest, we 'systematically overlook' differences beyond the necessary degree of fineness. The mechanism which accomplishes this 'systematic overlooking' is the information-processing system of the organism, and the principle according to which it is accomplished is that this system never expands more of its capacity on a given perceptual task than is necessary according to the current needs and interests of the agent.

— Sayre

- Lightness constancy refers to the constancy of an object's lightness regardless of varying amounts of light cast upon it. We detect, in the context of an object's surroundings, the characteristics of the fixed physical property and, from there, the lightness remains constant despite vast changes. See also Luminance.
- Distance constancy refers to the relationship between apparent distance and physical distance. An illusion example of this would be the moon - when it is near the horizon it is perceived as larger (size constancy) and/or closer to earth than when it is above our heads.
- Location constancy refers to the relationship between the viewer and the object. A stationary object is perceived as remaining stationary despite the retina sensing the object changing as the viewer moves (due to parallax). Location constancy is largely influenced by the context in which the object is found. An example of this would be looking at a parked car as one walks towards a building; the car is perceived as remaining stationary as one moves forward.

== Auditory ==
- In music, subjective constancy is the identification of a musical instrument as constant under changing timbre or "conditions of changing pitch and loudness, in different environments and with different players."
- In speech perception this means that vowels or consonants are perceived as constant categories even if acoustically, they vary greatly due to phonetic environment (coarticulation), speech tempo, speaker's age and sex, speaker's dialect, etc.

== Tactile ==
Rats’ perceptual reports about the relative location of external objects are hardly affected by strong environmental winds. This perceptual report constancy was shown to be achieved via motor control, whereby the perceptually-relevant sensory variables (the ‘proximal stimulus’) is maintained relatively constant.

== Research ==
- Comparing perception abilities in schizophrenic patients – A study found that distance constancy, being closely related to size constancy, was poorer in the schizophrenia patients than in the control group (labeled "normals"). "The result of poor distance constancy is that visual perception in schizophrenics is lacking in depth and that these patients live in a 'flatter' world."
- Visual auditory distance constancy – Researchers explored the relationship between visual and auditory responses and how they influence distance constancy. A study found that at a certain distance, when a sound is sensed, the eye is stimulated slightly before the ear is.
