= Delboeuf illusion =

Optical illusion

Though the two circled dark discs are the same size, the left disc seems smaller than the right one.

The Delboeuf illusion is an optical illusion of relative size perception: In the best-known version of the illusion, two discs of identical size have been placed near to each other and one is surrounded by a ring; the surrounded disc then appears larger than the non-surrounded disc if the ring is close, while appearing smaller than the non-surrounded disc if the ring is distant. A 2005 study suggests it is caused by the same visual processes that cause the Ebbinghaus illusion.

== Eponym ==
The illusion was named for the Belgian philosopher, mathematician, experimental psychologist, hypnotist, and psychophysicist Joseph Remi Leopold Delboeuf (1831–1896), who discovered it in 1865.

== Factors ==
According to Girgus and Coren (1982) the Delboeuf illusion uses both assimilation and contrast as elements in its perception distortion. Assimilation is the predominant factor in the disc in the smaller outer ring (the example on the right in the image above). Girgus and Coren mentioned that this inner disc “tends to be overestimated” when compared to a regular disc without the additional concentric circle. As the two circles are so close, they are perceived as a pair and the inner circle is overestimated.

The circle on the left however, will often appear smaller when compared to a simple circle of the same size. This is attributed to the contrast effect. The distance between the circles causes them to be perceived as separate and contrasting. The larger-circumference ring dwarfs the smaller central disc and causes it to be perceived as smaller.

After a few minutes of looking at this illusion, the illusory effects diminish for human subjects.

Studies regarding variations of the Delboeuf illusion found that when the outer circle is incomplete, the illusion is not as potent. When an additional circle was added surrounding the original two, the effect of the illusion was increased.

== Dieting and food perception ==
In 2012, Ittersum and Wansink published a study that hinted to the Delboeuf illusion as a factor in increased food servings. The study tested three different bowl diameters and measured how individuals served themselves differently depending on the bowl's diameter. The results showed that consumers poured 9.9% more soup in larger bowls, and 8.2% less in smaller bowls, as compared to the control bowls. It was mentioned that this reaction could be driven by the Delboeuf illusion.

This illusion in connection to food however appears to be nuanced: Zitron-Emanuel and Ganel (2018) highlighted how effects of the Delboeuf illusion, when related to food items, is less potent when the participants are experiencing mild hunger. These researchers suggest that these findings are potential grounds for mitigating the use of the Delboeuf illusion as a dieting aid.

== Use in animal cognition ==
The Delboeuf illusion (often in connection with the Ebbinghaus illusion) has been used with great frequency in testing animal perception, since the ability to discern size seems highly relevant for many aspects of survival, particularly regarding food. The perception of the Delboeuf illusion differs greatly depending on the species.

=== Primates ===
Parrish & Beran (2014) found that chimpanzees would regularly select food platters that contained more food. Further testing showed that when chimpanzees were offered food on small and large plates, they often picked the food on the smaller plate, even when the amounts were the same. This was discussed as a sign of the chimpanzee’s susceptibility to the Delboeuf illusion.

A later study showed that capuchin and rhesus monkeys, however, were unaffected by the illusion when asked to discriminate between the two circles. In contrast, when the illusion was later presented to the monkeys as part of an absolute classification task (deciding if the circles were "big" or "small"), both species reacted to the illusion and made selections that were much like the selections made by humans and chimpanzees.

An attempt to run tests of portion discrimination in connection to the Delboeuf illusion on ring-tailed lemurs was unsuccessful; the lemurs' meal selections were not increased by a statistically significant degree by larger food portions, unless one option was nearly 40% larger.

=== Dogs ===
Miletto-Petrazzini, Bisazza and Agrillo (2016) replicated the study conducted by Parrish and Beran (2014) but used dogs as the participants instead of chimpanzees. In this study, the dogs were allowed to select whichever food portion appeared larger as presented on larger and smaller plates. The response however was reversed from what humans usually exhibit: Dogs selected the meal presented on the larger plate most often. The authors went on to discuss how this may hint towards the dogs' reactions to the Delboeuf illusion as a matter of assimilated learning.

=== Fish ===
Fish have been repeatedly studied as well to understand if they perceive the Delboeuf illusion. Fish trained to select larger center circles for reward responded to the illusion differently depending on the species of fish. A 2008 study of damselfish illustrated that damselfish responded to variations of the Delboeuf illusion in a similar ways to humans and dolphins, while guppies responded in reverse, selecting the circles with the larger annulus. Bamboo sharks did not generally make selections significantly higher than chance during the testing, and only showed preference to larger diagrams in general.

=== Reptiles ===
Bearded dragons and red-footed tortoises were both studied to understand if these species can perceive the Delboeuf illusion. Bearded dragons showed action that suggests that they perceive the illusion in a way similar to humans. The tortoises, however, showed no preference for larger portions (a similar problem found in the study of ring-tailed lemurs) and were thus not testable by the method that had been outlined by the test designers.
