= Ponzo =

Ponzo is a surname. Notable people with the surname include:

- Giuseppe Ponzo (1759–1791), Italian composer
- Mario Ponzo (1882–1960), Italian psychologist
- Paolo Ponzo (1972–2013), Italian footballer
- Rafael Ponzo (born 1978), Venezuelan footballer
