= Assimilation =

Assimilation or Assimilate may refer to:

== Culture ==
- Cultural assimilation, the process whereby a minority group converts to the attitudes and customs of the prevailing culture and customs, abandoning their previous ones
  - Language shift, also known as language assimilation, the progressive process whereby a speech community of a language shifts to speaking another language
  - Cultural assimilation of Native Americans in the United States
  - Jewish assimilation refers to the gradual cultural assimilation and social integration of Jews in their surrounding culture
  - Religious assimilation refers to the adoption of a majority or dominant culture's religious practices and beliefs by a minority or subordinate culture
- Assimilation effect, a frequently observed bias in social cognition
- Assimilation (French colonial), an ideological basis of French colonial policy in the 19th and 20th centuries

== Science ==
- Assimilation (biology) the conversion of nutrient into the fluid or solid substance of the body, by the processes of digestion and absorption
- Assimilation (phonology), a linguistic process by which a sound becomes similar to an adjacent sound
- Data assimilation, updating a numerical model with observed data
- Assimilation (psychology), incorporation of new concepts into existing schemes
- Assimilation (geology), incorporation of external materials into a batch of magma during igneous differentiation

== Media ==
- Assimilation (album), a 2001 album by Deliverance
- Assimilation (Star Trek), fictional process used by the Borg race
- Assimilate, a 2019 sci-fi horror film
- Assimilate: A Critical History of Industrial Music, a 2013 non-fiction book
