= Interindividual differences in perception =

Effect of external factors on perception

Interindividual differences in perception describes the effect that differences in brain structure or factors such as culture, upbringing and environment have on the perception of humans. Interindividual (differing from person to person) variability is usually regarded as a source of noise for research. However, in recent years, it has become an interesting source to study sensory mechanisms and understand human behavior. With the help of modern neuroimaging methods such as fMRI and EEG, individual differences in perception could be related to the underlying brain mechanisms. This has helped to explain differences in behavior and cognition across the population. The present study using MRS provides direct evidence showing that the excitatory process in the suprasensory areas is linked to the individual differences in visual motion perception. The neurotransmitter concentration in the higher areas that execute cognitive functions is related to the interindividual variability in the perception of visual motion. Common methods include studying the perception of illusions, as they can effectively demonstrate how different aspects such as culture, genetics and the environment can influence human behavior.

== Optical Illusions ==
=== Bistable Motion ===
Aspect Ratio > 1

Aspect Ratio < 1

Two bistable motion quartets with differing aspect ratios

A motion quartet is a bistable stimulus - it consists of two dots that change their position from frame to frame. This position change can either be interpreted as horizontal or vertical movement by viewers, and this experience can switch during viewing between interpretations. Depending on the aspect ratio of the two dots' positions, one or the other state is perceived longer or more often. At an aspect ratio of one, the illusion is biased towards the vertical perception. The reason for this might be the way the human brain processes the signals from both eyes in the visual system. The right half of an eye's field of view is processed by the left hemisphere, and the left half by the right hemisphere. A stimulus moving vertically only involves one field of view and so one hemisphere, while a stimulus moving vertically from one field of view to the other involves both hemispheres, and requires communication between them. The delay caused by this additional signalling might be the cause for the bias. There are also individual differences in the way the motion quartet is perceived: Some people require a different aspect ratio to perceive both axes of movement than others. A study using diffusion tensor imaging further showed differences in the structure of the corpus callosum, the primary connection between the two hemispheres, might be the origin of these differences.

=== Object size estimation ===
There exist a variety of illusions that make objects appear bigger or smaller compared to their real size. Two such illusions are the Ebbinghaus and the Ponzo illusions. The Ebbinghaus illusion makes a dot seem bigger because it is surrounded by smaller dots, while the Ponzo illusion exploits human perspective processing by making a dot appear bigger because it seems farther away. Schwarzkopf et al. found that the size of the primary visual cortex (V1) has an effect on the magnitude of these illusions. The larger the subject's V1 surface area was, the less the subjects fell for the illusion. This is hypothesized to be due to the fact that a larger V1 dedicated to the same portion of the visual field means a lesser effect of later, fixed-size visual areas (which are the ones that are responsible for the illusion effect).

== Auditory Illusions ==
=== McGurk Effect ===
The McGurk effect is an auditory illusion in which people perceive a different syllable when incongruent audiovisual speech is presented: an auditory syllable "ba" is presented while the mouth movement is "ga". As a result, the listener perceives the syllable "da". However, according to Gentilucci and Cattaneo (2005), not everyone perceives this illusion; only about 26% to 98% of the population are susceptible to this illusion. One of the psychological models that explains the interindividual differences in speech perception is the fuzzy logic model of speech perception According to this model, a categorization process is carried out when processing speech sounds. When listening to a stimulus, the features of the acoustic signal are analyzed. Subsequently, this signal is compared with the features that are stored in the memory; finally the sound is classified into the category that best fits. However, this classification may have a blurred boundary respectively to the category which the sound belongs to. As a result, the final decision may depend on integration of multiple sources of information. When the McGurk effect is presented the auditory and visual components of the speech are separately evaluated before being integrated. In those who perceive the McGurk effect, the visual information has a higher influence on the perception of the ambiguous audiovisual information and thus the sound is classified as "da".

Many studies have concluded that the area responsible for the perception of this phenomenon is the left superior temporal sulcus(STS). This area is critical for the multisensory integration of visual and auditory information during speech perception. Moreover, there is a correlation between the activation of the STS and the perception of the McGurk effect. In that sense, if the left STS correctly integrates the mismatched audiovisual information, a McGurk effect is perceived; if the left STS is not active, the visual and auditory information are not integrated and thus a McGurk effect is not perceived.

In one study blood-oxygen-level dependent functional magnetic resonance imaging (BOLD fMRI) was used to measure the brain activity in perceivers and non-perceivers of the McGurk effect while presented with congruent audiovisual syllables, McGurk audiovisual syllables (auditory "ba" + visual "ga" producing perception of "da"), and non-McGurk incongruent syllables( auditory "ga" + visual "ba" producing auditory perception of "ga"). The researchers found that there was a positive correlation between the amplitude of response in the left STS and the probability of perceiving the McGurk effect. In other words, the subject with the weakest STS activation to incongruent speech had the smallest probability of experiencing a McGurk percept; whereas the subject with the strongest STS response had the highest probability.

Beauchamp et al. (2010) highlight the critical role of the left STS in audiovisual integration. They applied single pulses of transcranial magnetic stimulation (TMS) to the STS of McGurk perceivers during presentation of McGurk stimuli. The perception of the McGurk effect decreased from 94% to 43% and the subjects reported perceiving only the auditory syllable. Following from that, Beauchamp et al. conclude that the left STS is crucial for the audiovisual integration and thus for the perception of the McGurk effect.

Moreover, another study suggests that the basis of the interindividual differences in the perception of McGurk effect lies in the eye movements of the subject when viewing the talker's face. The experimenters carried out an eye tracking study and measured the eye movements of the participants while viewing audiovisual speech. They found that people who spent more time fixating the mouth of the talker were the more likely to perceive the McGurk effect than those who rarely fixated on the mouth of the speaker.

=== Other auditory illusions ===
Representation of the pitch class circle with respect to tone height

Interindividual differences have also been researched for the Tritone paradox illusion. In this illusion, the subject successively listens to two tones, which are separated by a half octave. Each tone is made of a set of harmonics which have an octave relation. The listener has to decide if the two tones have a descending or ascending relation. According to Diana Deutsch, the perception of the tones is influenced by the language spoken by the listener. The listener has a circular representation of the pitch of sounds that are common in their culture and based on that develops a pitch range of their speaking voice, which determines the orientation of the pitch class with respect to the height; when a given tone is in this range, it is taken as the highest position along the circle and depending on the second tone, the person perceives the pattern as ascending or descending. Deutsch found that for people from California, the tone in the highest position of the pitch-class circle is around C# and D whereas for people from southern England it is around G. According to those results, Deutsch hypothesized that the orientation of the pitch-class circle with respect to the height is similar for individuals from the same linguistic group and varies for individuals from different linguistic groups.

Other illusions found by Deutsch whose interpretation depends on interindividual differences is the phantom words illusion. This illusion consists of the continuous presentation of two meaningless syllables. In order to experience the illusion, it is necessary that the listener sits between two loudspeakers, one to the left and the other to the right. The syllables are presented offset in time, in such a way that while one syllable is coming from the left, the other syllable is coming from the right loudspeaker. It was shown that after a period of time, people start hearing words. According to Deutsch, the perceived words depend on the language spoken by the listener, their knowledge and their expectations. According to Shinn-Cunningham (2008), when the information is incomplete or contradictory, the perceptual system often fills this gaps with plausible interpretations and in that way allows new information to be efficiently processed.

== Effect of Culture on Perception ==
The framed line test

Several studies have shown that differences between individuals play a significant role in determining how a stimulus is perceived. These differences among people, in turn, are greatly influenced by one's own socio-cultural contexts. The research indicates that cultural factors influence the process of perception not just on lower-level (such as object perception and attention deployment), but also on the higher-order functions (such as theory of mind and emotion recognition).

The two major cultures analyzed in these studies were mostly Western and East Asian cultures because of the considerable differences in the social structure and practices. Western culture was referred to as an analytical culture whereas Eastern culture was referred more as a holistic culture. More specifically, individualism and freedom are the predominant values in Western societies, which in turn demand interpretation of an object in its absolute terms independent of its context. In contrast, Eastern culture is known for its emphasis on collectivism and interdependence on each other, where interpretation of an object is often in relation with its context

A pioneer study examining these cultural differences in visual perception was conducted by Kitayama et al. (2003). The findings of that study provide behavioural evidence on how cultural factors affect visual perception and attention deployment. For the study, Americans and Japanese were taken as subjects. The visual stimulus shown to the subjects consisted of a square figure with a line hanging from the centre (the framed line test). First was the absolute condition, where the task was to redraw the line on the centre of the square in its absolute length, to a new square box independent of its size. Second was the relative condition, in which the task was to redraw the line proportionally similar to context of the new square box. The results show that Americans perform better in the absolute task which requires analytical processing of stimulus independent of it context, whereas the Japanese performed better at the relative task which demands the holistic processing of the stimulus in relation to its context.

In line with these findings, Hedden and colleagues (2009) used the same visual stimuli to investigate the neural activity with the help of fMRI. Participants of the study were asked to judge the length of a vertical line, either including the contextual information or ignoring it. The results revealed that separate brain regions were employed while performing the task, either incorporating the contextual information or avoiding it, based on one's own culture. The areas associated with attentional control in the frontal and parietal region of the brain were highly activated when the subjects performed the task which was incongruent to their cultural pattern. That is, the activity in the fronto-parietal region enhanced when East Asians had to ignore the contextual information, while similar enhancement happened for Americans when they had to incorporate the contextual information. These findings illustrate that the function of the neural mechanisms are also modulated to some extent by one's own culture.

A follow-up fMRI study by Gutchess, Welsh, Boduroglu, and Park (2006) confirmed the previous findings by using a rather complex stimulus, which consists of only the object pictures, object with background pictures and only the background pictures without the object. This particular study was done on East-Asian Americans and non-Asian Americans. Though the performance of both subject groups was equally good, the activity of the involved brain areas was significantly different. Non-Asian Americans had a higher activation in the object processing areas in the ventral visual cortex during the object recognition task whereas the East-Asian Americans exhibited higher activity in the left occipital and fusiform areas which are associated with perceptual analysis.
