= Colour centre =

Brain region responsible for colour processing

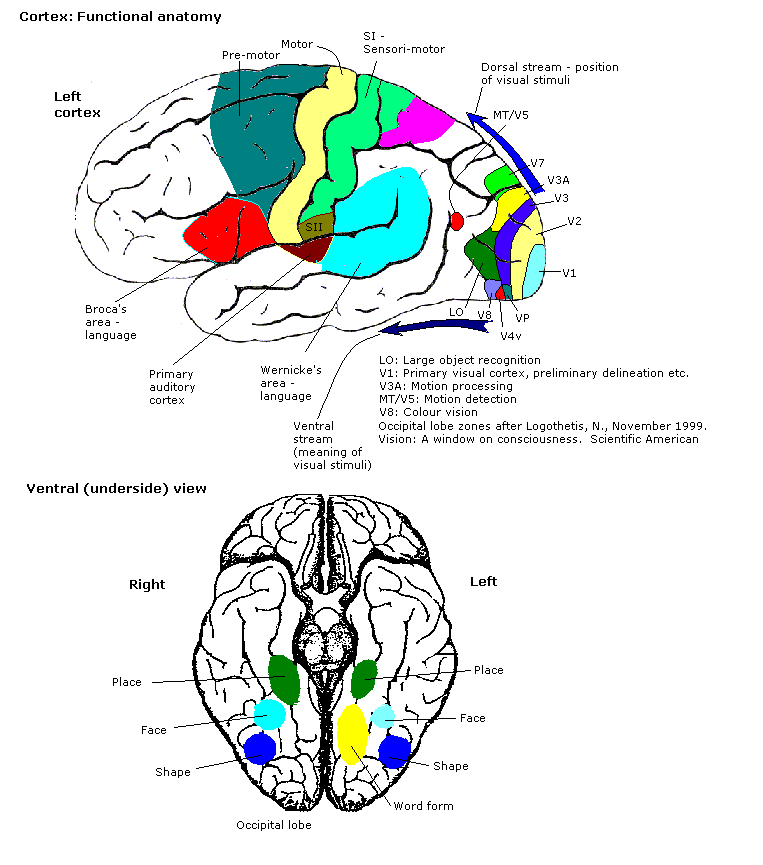
- Colour vision area shown as V8 on upper image

The colour centre is a region in the brain primarily responsible for visual perception and cortical processing of colour signals received by the eye, which ultimately results in colour vision. The colour centre in humans is thought to be located in the ventral occipital lobe as part of the visual system, in addition to other areas responsible for recognising and processing specific visual stimuli, such as faces, words, and objects. Many functional magnetic resonance imaging (fMRI) studies in both humans and macaque monkeys have shown colour stimuli to activate multiple areas in the brain, including the fusiform gyrus and the lingual gyrus. These areas, as well as others identified as having a role in colour vision processing, are collectively labelled visual area 4 (V4). The exact mechanisms, location, and function of V4 are still being investigated.

== Primary visual cortex ==
The primary part of the visual cortex, (V1), is located in the calcarine sulcus, and is the first cortical area involved in visual processing. It receives visual input from the lateral geniculate nucleus, which is located in the thalamus. V1 sends the visual information received from the LGN to other extrastriate cortex areas for higher order processing. This higher order processing includes the recognition of shapes, motion, and colour.

V1 has multiple areas that are colour-sensitive, which indicates that colour processing is not limited to one area. According to a paper by Dr Robert Shapley, V1 has an important role in colour perception. fMRI experimental results showed that V1 has two kinds of colour sensitive neurons: single-opponent and double-opponent cells. These cells are integral in the opponent process of interpreting colour signals. Single-opponent neurons respond to large areas of colour. This is advantageous for recognizing large colour scenes and atmospheres. In comparison, double-opponent cells respond to patterns, textures, and colour boundaries. This is more important for perceiving the colour of objects and pictures. The double-opponent cells are receptive to opposite inputs from different cone cells in the retina. This is ideal for identifying contrasting colours, such as red and green. Double-opponent cells are particularly important in computing local cone ratios from visual information from their receptive fields.

Single-opponent colour-sensitive neurons can be divided into two categories depending on the signals they receive from the cone cells: L-M neurons and S/(L+M) neurons. The three types of cone cells, small (S), medium (M), and long (L), detect different wavelengths across the visible spectrum. S cone cells can see short wavelength colours, which corresponds to violet and blue. Similarly, M cells detect medium wavelength colours, such as green and yellow, and L cells detect long wavelength colours, like red. L-M neurons, also called red-green opponent cells, receive input from long wavelength cones opposed by input from medium wavelength cones. S/(L+M) neurons receive input from S-cells and is opposed by a sum of the L and M-cell inputs. S/(L+M) neurons are also called blue-yellow opponent cells. The opposition between the colours allows the visual system to interpret differences in colour, which is ultimately more efficient than processing colours separately.

== Higher order visual processing ==
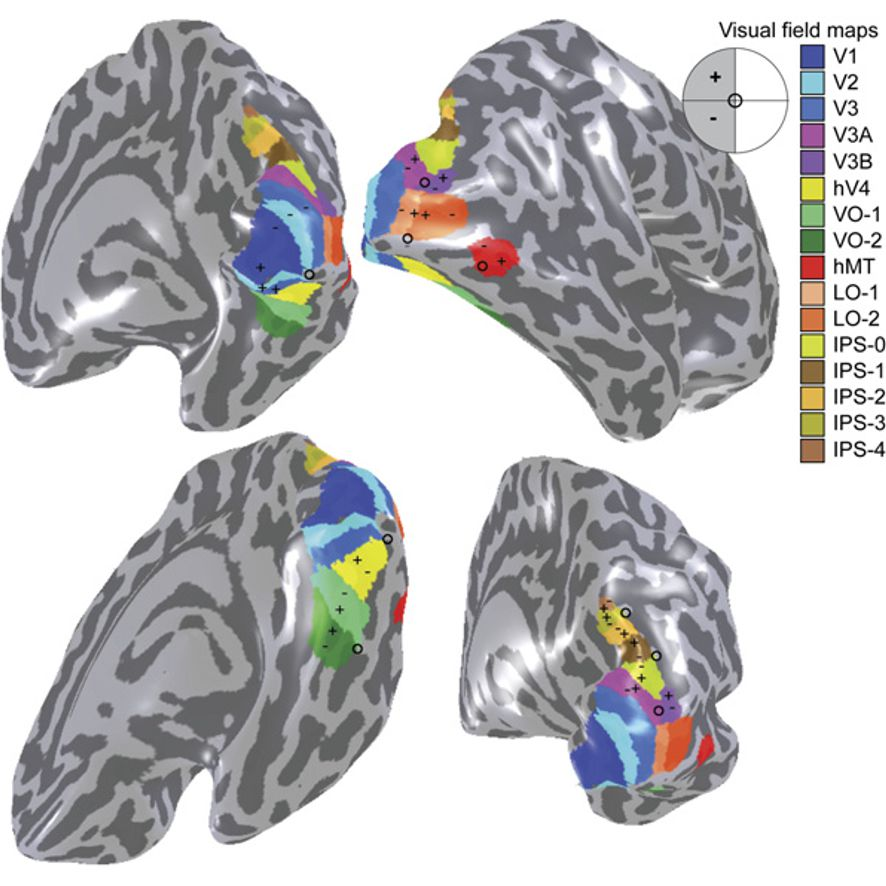
A visual field map of the primary visual cortex and the numerous extrastriate areas

The primary visual cortex V1 sends visual information to the extrastriate cortical areas for higher order visual processing. These extrastriate cortical areas are located anterior to the occipital lobe. The main ones are designated as visual areas V2, V3, V4, and V5/MT. Each area can have multiple functions. Recent findings have shown that the colour centre is neither isolated nor traceable to a single area in the visual cortex. Rather, there are multiple areas that possibly have different roles in the ability to process colour stimulus.

=== Visual area V4 ===
The lingual gyrus is the hypothetical location of V4 in macaque monkeys. In humans, this area is called hV4.

The fusiform gyrus is the hypothetical location of V4α, a secondary area for colour processing.

Anatomical and physiological studies have established that the colour centre begins in V1 and sends signals to extrastriate areas V2 and V4 for further processing. V4 in particular is an area of interest because of the strength of the colour receptive fields in its neurons. V4 was initially identified in macaque monkey visual cortex experiments. Originally, it was proposed that colour was selectively processed in V4. However, this hypothesis was later rejected in favour of another hypothesis which suggested that V4 and other areas around V4 work together to process colour in the form of multiple colour selective regions. After identification of V4 as the colour-selective region in macaque monkeys, scientists began searching for a homologous structure in the human cortex. Using fMRI brain imaging, scientists found three main areas stimulated by colour: V1, an area in the ventral occipital lobe, specifically the lingual gyrus, which was designated as human V4, or hV4, and another area located anteriorly in the fusiform gyrus, designated as V4α.

Our understanding of the purpose of V4 has changed dynamically as new studies have been performed. Since V4 responds strongly to colour in both macaque monkeys and humans, it has become an area of interest to scientists. The V4 area was originally attributed to colour selectivity, but new evidence has shown that V4, as well as other areas of the visual cortex, are receptive to various inputs. V4 neurons are receptive to a number of properties, such as colour, brightness, and texture. It is also involved in processing shape, orientation, curvature, motion, and depth.

The actual organization of hV4 in the cortex is still being investigated. In the macaque monkey, V4 spans the dorsal and ventral occipital lobe. Human experiments have shown that V4 only spans the ventral portion. This led to distinguishing hV4 from the macaque V4. A recent study from Winawer et al. analysing fMRI measurements to map the hV4 and ventral occipital areas showed variances between subjects used for hV4 mapping was at first attributed to instrumentation error, but Winawer argued that the sinuses in the brain interfered with fMRI measurements. Two models for hV4 were tested: one model had hV4 completely in the ventral side, and the second model had hV4 split into dorsal and ventral sections. It was concluded that it was still difficult to map the activity of hV4, and that further investigation was required. However, other evidence, such as lesions in the ventral occipital lobe causing achromatopsia, suggested that the ventral occipital area plays an important role in colour vision. In addition, it has recently been shown that activation of area V4 in humans (area V4h) is observed during the perception and retention of the color of objects, but not their shape.

=== V4α ===
The search for the human equivalent of V4 led to the discovery of other areas that were stimulated by colour. The most significant was an area anterior in the ventral occipital lobe, subsequently named V4α. Further fMRI experiments found that V4α had a different function than V4, but worked cooperatively with it. V4α is involved in a number of processes, and is active during tasks requiring colour ordering, imagery, knowledge about colour, colour illusions, and object colour.

=== V4-V4α complex ===
The V4 and V4α areas are separate entities, but because of their close proximity in the fusiform gyrus, these two areas are often collectively called the V4-complex. Research into the V4-complex discovered that different chromatic stimulations activated either the V4 or the V4α area, and some stimulation parameters activated both. For example, naturally coloured images activated V4α more powerfully than V4. Unnaturally coloured images activated both V4α and V4 equally. It was concluded that the two sub-divisions co-operate with each other in order to generate colour images, but they are also functionally separate.

A study by Nunn et al. on the activation of the V4-complex in people with visual synaesthesia from hearing spoken words was used to predict the location of the colour centre. Synaesthesia is the phenomenon where a sensory stimulus produces an automatic and involuntary reaction in a different sensation. In this study, people who would see colours upon hearing words were studied to see if the colour reaction could be traced to a specific cortical area. fMRI results showed that the left fusiform gyrus, an area consistent with V4, was activated when the subjects spoke. They also found a simultaneous activation of V4α. There was little activity in areas V1 and V2. These results validated the existence of the V4-complex in humans as an area specialized for colour vision.

=== V2 prestriate cortex ===
V2, also called the prestriate cortex, is believed to have a small role in colour processing by projecting signals from V1 to the V4-complex. Whether or not colour selective cells are present in V2 is still being investigated. Some optical imaging studies have found small clusters of red-green colour selective cells in V1 and V2, but not any blue-yellow colour selective cells. Other studies have shown that V2 is activated by colour stimuli, but not colour after images.[8] V4 also has feedback on V2, suggesting that there is a defined network of communication between the multiple areas of the visual cortex. When GABA, an inhibitory neurotransmitter, was injected into V4 cells, V2 cells experienced a significant decrease in excitability.

== Research methods ==
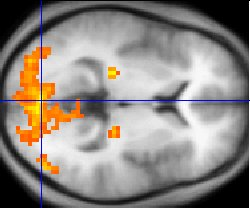
fMRI showing activity in the primary visual cortex V1

Functional magnetic resonance imaging, or fMRI for short, has been key in determining the colour selective regions in the visual cortex. fMRI is able to track brain activity by measuring blood flow throughout the brain. Areas that have more blood flowing to them indicates an occurrence of neuronal activity. This change in blood flow is called haemodynamic response. Among the benefits of fMRI includes dynamic, real-time mapping of cortical processes. However, fMRI cannot track the actual firing of neurons, which happen on a millisecond timescale, but it can track the haemodynamic response, which happens on a seconds timescale. This method is ideal for tracking colour selective neurons because colour perception results in a visual after-image that can be observed in the neurons, which lasts about 15 seconds.

Sakai et al. used fMRI to observe whether activation of the fusiform gyrus correlated with the perception of colour and the after image. The subjects in the Sakai study were placed in the fMRI machine and were subsequently subjected to various visual stimuli. A series of three images were shown to subjects while fMRI was used to focus on the haemodynamics of the fusiform gyrus. The first image was a pattern of six coloured circles. The next two images were achromatic. One of the images had a grey cross, and the other image had the same six circles as the first image, except they were six shades of grey that correlated with the coloured images. The subjects were cycled between the circle and cross images. During the cross images, the subjected perceived an after-image. The results of the experiment showed that there was a significant increase of activity in the fusiform gyrus when the subject viewed the colour image. This provided more evidence to the existence of the colour centre outside of the primary visual cortex.

== Cerebral achromatopsia ==
Cerebral achromatopsia is a chronic condition where a person is unable to see colour, but they are still able to recognize shape and form. Cerebral achromatopsia differs from congenital achromatopsia in that it is caused by damage to the cerebral cortex as opposed to abnormalities in the retinal cells. The search for the colour centre was motivated by the discovery that lesions in the ventral occipital lobe led to colour blindness, as well as the idea that there are area specializations in the cortex. Many studies have shown that lesions in the areas commonly identified as the colour centre, such as V1, V2, and the V4-complex lead to achromatopsia. Cerebral achromatopsia occurs after injury to the lingual or fusiform gyrus, the areas associated with hV4. These injuries include physical trauma, stroke, and tumour growth. One of the primary initiatives to locating the colour centre in the visual cortex is to discover the cause and a possible treatment of cerebral achromatopsia.

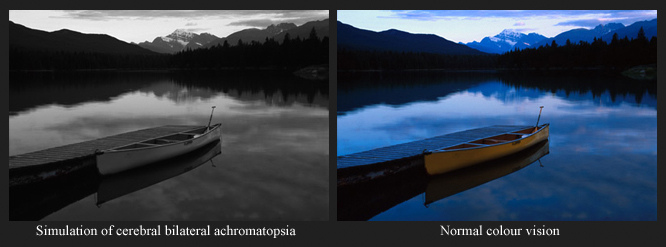
Simulation of cerebral achromatopsia

The extent of the symptoms and the damage is different from person to person. If a person has complete achromatopsia, then their entire visual field is devoid of colour. A person with dyschromatopsia, or incomplete achromatopsia, has similar symptoms to complete achromatopsia, but to a lesser degree. This can occur in people who had achromatopsia, but the brain recovered from the injury, restoring some colour vision. The person may be able to see certain colours. However, there are many cases where there is no recovery. Finally, a person with hemiachromatopsia see half of their field of vision in colour, and the other half in grey. The visual hemifield contralateral to a lesion in the lingual or fusiform gyrus is the one that appears grey, while the ipsilateral visual hemifield appears in colour. The variance in symptoms emphasizes the need to understand the architecture of the colour centre in order to better diagnose and possible treat cerebral achromatopsia.
