= Mario Ponzo =

Italian psychologist

- Born: 23 June 1882; Milan
- Died: 9 January 1960 (aged 77); Rome
- Education: University of Turin
- Known for: Ponzo illusion
- Scientific career
- Fields: Psychology
- Workplaces: University of Rome

Mario Ponzo (Italian pronunciation: [ˈpontso]; June 23, 1882 – January 9, 1960) was an Italian academic psychologist. He was also the Professor Emeritus of Psychology at the University of Rome as well as the Honorary President of the Italian Society of Psychology. He was born in Milan, Italy to a Piedmontese family.

The Ponzo Illusion

== Academic career ==
He went on to study medicine at the University of Turin while also studying psychology under Frederico Kiesow, receiving his degree in 1906. He was appointed docent in psychology in 1911 and worked under Kiesow for twenty-five years after his graduation, until he was asked to join the Faculty of Medicine at the University of Rome in 1931. There, he succeeded Sante De Sanctis as the chair of psychology and remained in the position until his retirement in 1952. After his retirement he worked as a non-staff professor for an additional five years, and was named Professor Emeritus in 1958. He was also involved in vocational guidance while he was in Rome and founded a school at the Institute of Psychology at the University of Rome.

== Research ==
Ponzo contributed to several Italian and non-Italian psychology journals including Psychological Abstracts and Psychological Reports. In 1911 he published an article in the journal Archives Italiennes de Biologie which deals with the Aristotle illusion, a phenomenon where a small round object touched to two crossed fingers feels like two objects. His name is associated with the so-called Ponzo illusion, although he never claimed to have discovered this effect, which can be traced to earlier publications. He studied it, and proposed that a similar contrast effect can explain the Moon illusion: the fact that the Moon appears much larger at the horizon.

For the Atti della Regia Accademia delle Scienze di Torino he wrote what has been described as the first article in Italian on the psychology of cinema. Two of his works on the topic were translated into English in 2017 as a part of a compilation of early film theories from Italy called The Little Magic Machine. One of his articles on the psychology of cinema include Cinema and Juvenile Delinquency which looks at the relationship between negative behavior in young people and cinema. Another one is entitled"About Some Psychological Observations Made during Film Screenings'' which looks at the principle of motion perception during motion picture screenings. At the time of his death, he had been published approximately 280 times. Ponzo also served as a foreign associate for the American Psychological Association, as a member of the Hungarian and German Societies of Psychology, and of the International Association of Applied Psychology. Ponzo was interested in variety of fields within the larger realm of psychology including sensory and perceptual processes, imaginative and representative processes, personality, psychomotor processes, and applied psychology.
