= Melvyn A. Goodale =

Canadian neuroscientist (born 1943)

Melvyn Goodale
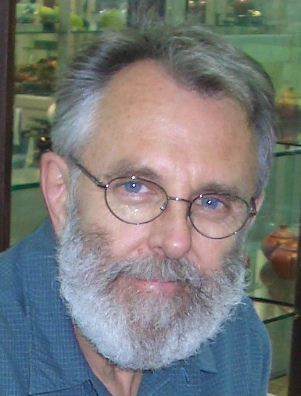
- Born: Melvyn Alan Goodale; January 22, 1943 (age 83); Leigh-on-Sea, Essex, England
- Awards: FRS (2013)
- Scientific career
- Fields: Neuroscience
- Institutions: University of Western Ontario; University of Oxford; University of Calgary; University of St Andrews
- Website: psychology.uwo.ca/faculty/goodale

Melvyn Alan Goodale FRSC, FRS is a Canadian neuroscientist. He was the founding Director of the Brain and Mind Institute at the University of Western Ontario where he holds the Canada Research Chair in Visual Neuroscience. He holds appointments in the Departments of Psychology, Physiology & Pharmacology, and Ophthalmology at Western. Goodale's research focuses on the neural substrates of visual perception and visuomotor control. In 2025, Goodale was named the top life-time scholar of the visual system by ScholarsGPS.

== Biography ==
Goodale was born in Leigh-on-Sea, Essex, England in 1943. He emigrated with his parents to Calgary, Alberta, Canada in 1949. He received a Bachelor of Arts degree in Psychology from the University of Alberta at Calgary in 1963 and a Master of Arts degree in Psychology from the University of Calgary in 1966. He left Calgary in 1966 for London Ontario where he completed a PhD in Psychology at the University of Western Ontario in 1969. Goodale then returned to the UK where he was a Postdoctoral Fellow from 1969 to 1971 in the Department of Experimental Psychology at the University of Oxford, under the supervision of Lawrence Weiskrantz. Following his postdoctoral research at Oxford, Goodale accepted a position in the School of Psychology at the University of St. Andrews in Scotland. In 1977, he went back to Canada to take up a position at the University of Western Ontario, where he has remained ever since.

== Research ==
Goodale was a pioneer in the study of the neural substrates of visuomotor control, first in animals and later in humans. Goodale’s early work in the 1980s, in which he demonstrated that visual perception is functionally independent of the visual control of action, laid the foundation for the ‘duplex’ account of high-level vision which he developed later, together with his long-time colleague, David Milner (originally based at the University of St. Andrews but now at Durham University). In a short paper, Goodale and Milner proposed that the distinction between vision-for-perception and vision-for-action could be mapped onto the two streams of visual projections arising from early visual areas in the primate cerebral cortex: the ventral stream which projects to inferotemporal cortex and the dorsal stream which projects to the posterior parietal cortex. This account provides a convincing resolution to conflicting accounts of visual function that has characterized much of the work in the field for the last one hundred years. Over the last decade, Goodale has led much of neuroimaging and psychophysical research that has refined and extended the two-visual-systems proposal. These ideas have had an enormous influence in the life sciences and medicine. The two-visual-systems proposal is now part of almost every textbook in vision, cognitive neuroscience, and psychology.

According to Goodale and Milner’s two visual systems model, visual perception uses relative metrics and scene-based frames of reference whereas the visual control of action uses real-world metrics and egocentric frames of reference. Support for this idea comes from work showing that the scaling of grasping movements directed towards objects embedded in pictorial illusions, such as the Ebbinghaus illusion and the Ponzo illusion, escapes the effects of these illusions. In other words, the opening between the index finger and thumb is scaled to the real not the apparent size of the target object as the hand approaches the object.

Goodale has also argued that actions such as grasping, which are mediated by dorsal-stream mechanisms, take place in real time and are directed at visible objects. We rarely act on objects after a delay when they are no longer visible – and when we do, we are simply pantomiming the real action using a memory of the object that we perceived earlier derived from ventral-stream processing. Thus, when a delay is introduced between viewing a display and initiating the grasping movement, the scaling of the grip aperture is now sensitive to illusions.

In recent years, Goodale has been using functional magnetic resonance imaging (fMRI) to investigate activity in the dorsal and ventral streams during the performance of visually guided actions. He and his research team have shown that grasping a visible object results in selective activation in the dorsal stream without any grasp-related activity in the ventral stream. This suggests that the analysis of an object’s shape, size, and orientation for grasping is carried out in the dorsal stream independently of any contribution from areas in the ventral stream, such as the lateral occipital complex, that have been shown to be involved in object recognition. Goodale has also used fMRI to study of object recognition and visually-guided grasping in a patient with damage to the ventral stream. These and other neuroimaging studies of object recognition and grasping in the Goodale laboratory have provided additional support for the proposed division of labour between the dorsal and ventral streams. Recent advances in understanding of human visuomotor control along with major advances in fMRI neural network analysis will likely expand on the rather simplistic view of the dorsal and ventral streams, integrating them into large scale whole brain networks.

== Awards and honours ==
Goodale is an honorary fellow of the Wolfson Research Institute at Durham University. In 1999, the Canadian Society for Brain, Behaviour and Cognitive Science gave him their Donald O. Hebb Distinguished Contribution Award. He became a fellow of the Royal Society of Canada in 2001 and the Royal Society in 2013. In 2008, he won the Richard C. Tees Award for distinguished leadership from the CSBBCS.

Goodale was elected a Fellow of the Royal Society of London in 2013. His nomination reads:

Goodale is one of the world’s leading visual neuroscientists. He was a pioneer in the study of the neural substrates of visuomotor control, first in animals and later in humans. He has demonstrated that the visual control of action is functionally independent of visual perception. With a series of elegant experiments he has refined and extended the proposal that there are two visual systems, and his account is now part of almost every textbook in vision, cognitive neuroscience, and psychology.
