= Visual cortex =

Region of the brain that processes visual information

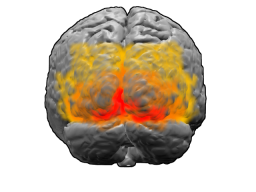
- View of the brain from behind. (Note: The rear of the head is its caudal part, opposite the eyes.) Red = Brodmann area 17 (primary visual cortex); orange = area 18; yellow = area 19

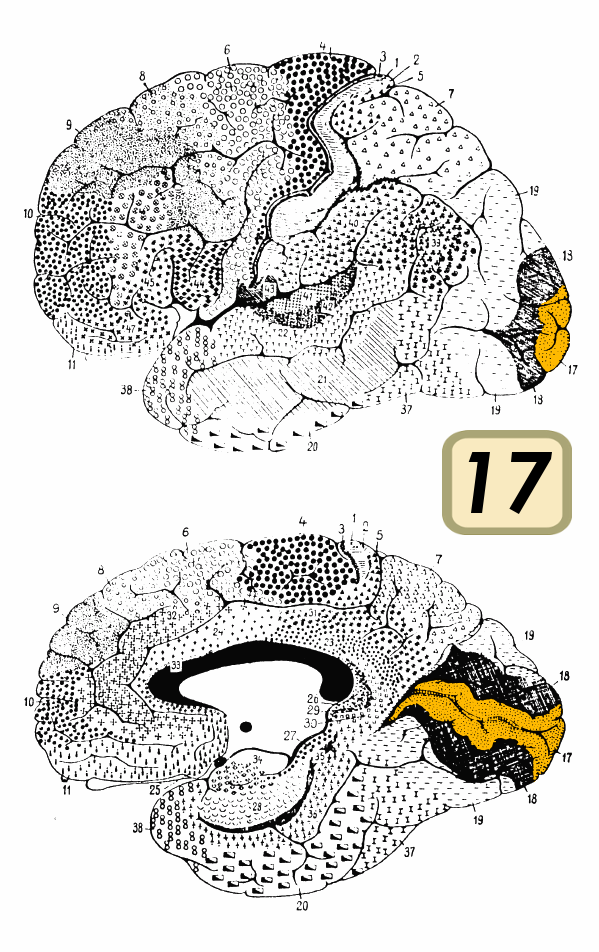
- Brain shown from the side, eyes facing left. Above: view from outside, below: cut through the middle. Orange = Brodmann area 17 (primary visual cortex)

Details

Identifiers
- Latin: cortex visualis
- MeSH: D014793
- NeuroLex ID: nlx_143552
- FMA: 242644

In mammals, the visual cortex of the brain is the area of the cerebral cortex that processes visual information. It is located in the occipital lobe, located at the rear of the head. Sensory input originating from the eyes travels through the lateral geniculate nucleus in the thalamus and then reaches the visual cortex. The area of the visual cortex that receives the sensory input from the lateral geniculate nucleus is the primary visual cortex, also known as visual area 1 (V1), Brodmann area 17, or the striate cortex. The extrastriate areas consist of visual areas 2, 3, 4, and 5 (also known as V2, V3, V4, and V5, or Brodmann area 18 and all Brodmann area 19).

Both hemispheres of the brain include a visual cortex; the visual cortex in the left hemisphere receives signals from the right visual field, and the visual cortex in the right hemisphere receives signals from the left visual field.

== Introduction ==
The primary visual cortex (V1) is located in and around the calcarine fissure in the occipital lobe. Each hemisphere's V1 receives information directly from its ipsilateral lateral geniculate nucleus that receives signals from the contralateral visual hemifield.

Neurons in the visual cortex fire action potentials when visual stimuli appear within their receptive field. By definition, the receptive field is the region within the entire visual field that elicits an action potential. A given neuron may respond most strongly to particular stimuli within its receptive field. This property is called neuronal tuning. In the earlier visual areas, neurons have simpler tuning. For example, a neuron in V1 may fire to any vertical stimulus in its receptive field. In the higher visual areas, neurons have complex tuning. For example, in the inferior temporal cortex (IT), a neuron may fire only when a certain face appears in its receptive field.

The visual cortex receives its blood supply primarily from the calcarine branch of the posterior cerebral artery.

The size of V1, V2, and V3 can vary three-fold, a difference that is partially inherited.

== Psychological model of the neural processing of visual information ==
The dorsal stream (green) and ventral stream (purple) are shown. They originate from primary visual cortex.

=== Ventral-dorsal model ===
V1 transmits information to two primary pathways, called the ventral stream and the dorsal stream.

- The ventral stream begins with V1, goes through visual area V2, then through visual area V4, and to the inferior temporal cortex (IT cortex). The ventral stream, sometimes called the "What Pathway", is associated with form recognition and object representation. It is also associated with storage of long-term memory.
- The dorsal stream begins with V1, goes through Visual area V2, then to the dorsomedial area (DM/V6) and middle temporal area (MT/V5) and to the posterior parietal cortex. The dorsal stream, sometimes called the "Where Pathway" or "How Pathway", is associated with motion, representation of object locations, and control of the eyes and arms, especially when visual information is used to guide saccades or reaching.

The what vs. where account of the ventral/dorsal pathways was first described by Ungerleider and Mishkin.

More recently, Goodale and Milner extended these ideas and suggested that the ventral stream is critical for visual perception whereas the dorsal stream mediates the visual control of skilled actions. It has been shown that visual illusions such as the Ebbinghaus illusion distort judgements of a perceptual nature, but when the subject responds with an action, such as grasping, no distortion occurs.

Work such as that from Franz et al. suggests that both the action and perception systems are equally fooled by such illusions. Other studies, however, provide strong support for the idea that skilled actions such as grasping are not affected by pictorial illusions and suggest that the action/perception dissociation is a useful way to characterize the functional division of labor between the dorsal and ventral visual pathways in the cerebral cortex.

== Primary visual cortex (V1) ==
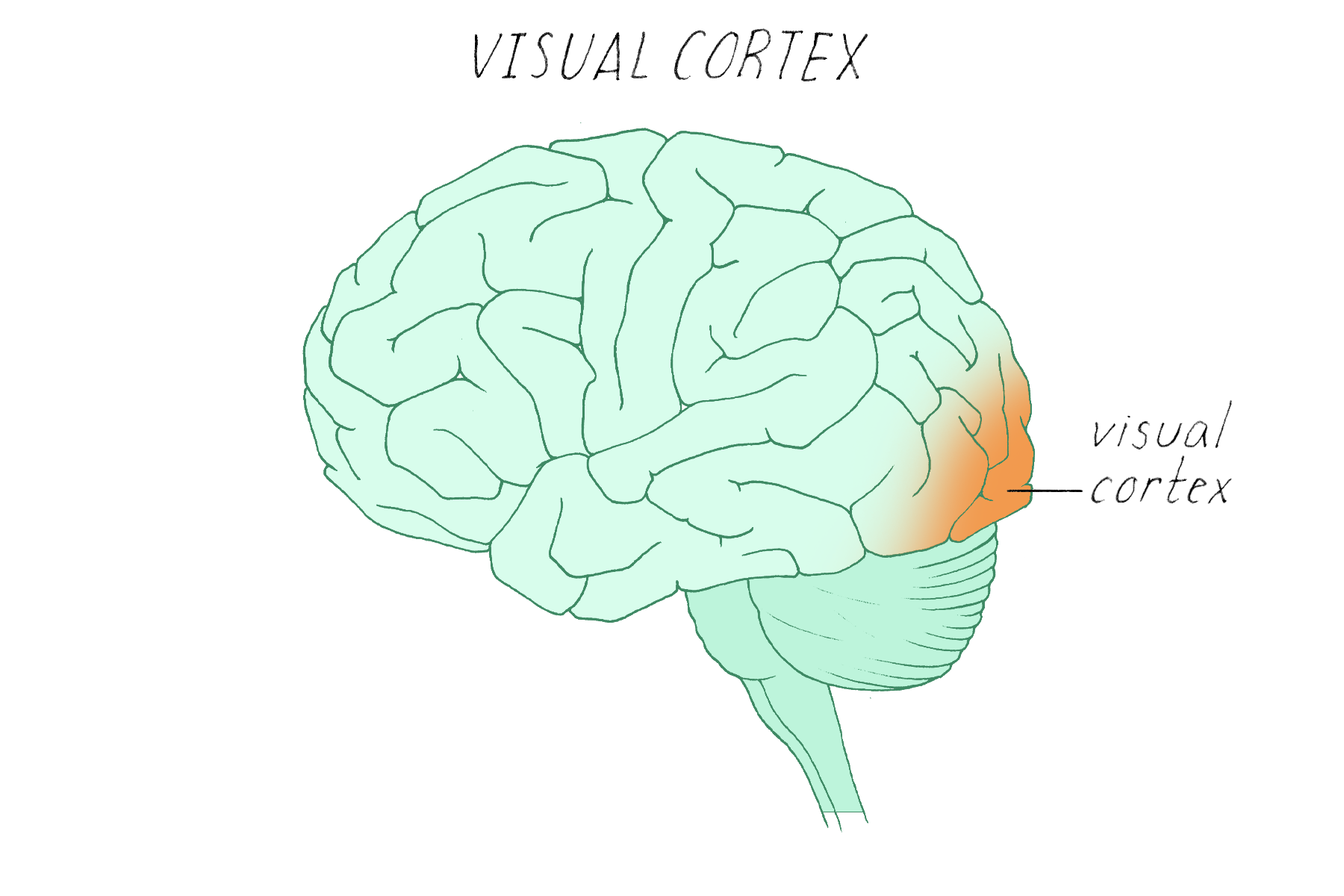

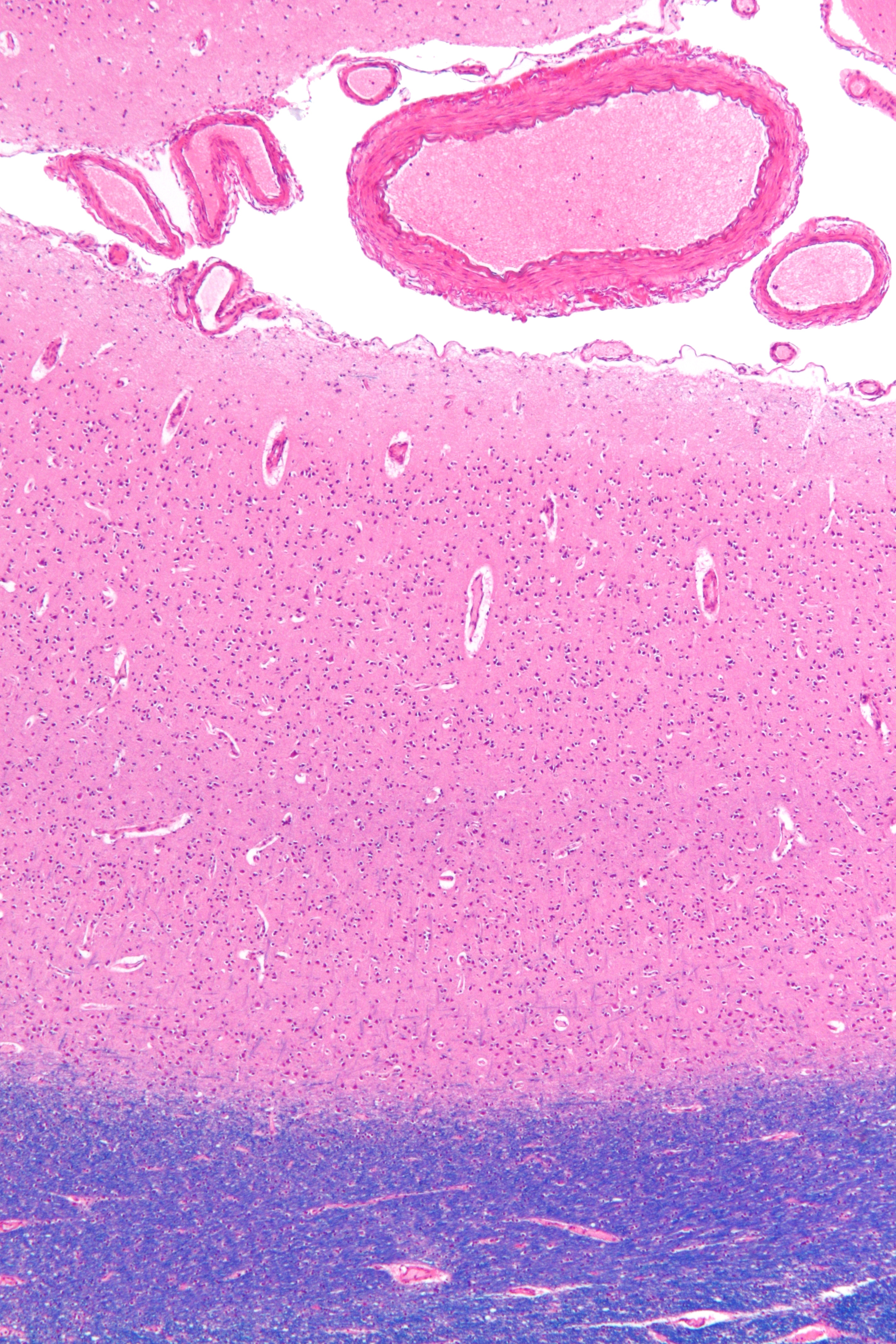
Micrograph showing the visual cortex (pink). The pia mater and arachnoid mater including blood vessels are seen at the top of the image. Subcortical white matter (blue) is seen at the bottom of the image. HE-LFB stain.

Micrograph of the primary visual cortex (aka striate cortex; Brodmann area 17) of a rhesus macaque (Macaca mulatta). Cortical layers 1-6 are denoted; white matter lies beneath layer 6, and the line of Gennari occupies layer 4B. Nissl stain. Scale bar = 200 microns (0.2 mm).

The primary visual cortex is the most studied visual area in the brain. In mammals, it is located in the posterior pole of the occipital lobe and is the simplest, earliest cortical visual area. It is highly specialized for processing information about static and moving objects and is excellent in pattern recognition.

The primary visual cortex, which is defined by its function or stage in the visual system, is approximately equivalent to the striate cortex, also known as Brodmann area 17, which is defined by its anatomical location. The name "striate cortex" is derived from the line of Gennari, a distinctive stripe visible to the naked eye that represents myelinated axons from the lateral geniculate body terminating in layer 4 of the gray matter.

The primary visual cortex is divided into six functionally distinct layers, labeled 1 to 6. Layer 4, which receives most visual input from the lateral geniculate nucleus (LGN), is further divided into 4 layers, labelled 4A, 4B, 4Cα, and 4Cβ. Sublamina 4Cα receives mostly magnocellular input from the LGN, while layer 4Cβ receives input from parvocellular pathways.

The average number of neurons in the adult human primary visual cortex in each hemisphere has been estimated at 140 million. The volume of each V1 area in an adult human is about 5400mm${}^3$ on average. A study of 25 hemispheres from 15 normal individuals with average age 59 years at autopsy found a very high variation, from 4272 to 7027mm${}^3$ for the right hemisphere (mean 5692mm${}^3$), and from 3185 to 7568mm${}^3$ for the left hemisphere (mean 5119mm${}^3$), with 0.81 correlation between left and right hemispheres. The same study found average V1 area 2400mm${}^2$ per hemisphere, but with very high variability. (Right hemisphere mean 2477mm${}^2$, range 1441–3221mm${}^2$. Left hemisphere mean 2315mm${}^2$, range 1438–3365mm${}^2$.)

=== Function ===
The correspondence between a given location in V1 and in the subjective visual field is very precise: even the blind spots of the retina are mapped into V1. In terms of evolution, this correspondence is very basic and found in most animals that possess a V1. In humans and other animals with a fovea (cones in the retina), a large portion of V1 is mapped to the small, central portion of visual field, a phenomenon known as cortical magnification. Perhaps for the purpose of accurate spatial encoding, neurons in V1 have the smallest receptive field size (that is, the highest resolution) of any visual cortex microscopic regions.

The tuning properties of V1 neurons (what the neurons respond to) differ greatly over time. Early in time (40 ms and further) individual V1 neurons have strong tuning to a small set of stimuli. That is, the neuronal responses can discriminate small changes in visual orientations, spatial frequencies and colors (as in the optical system of a camera obscura, but projected onto retinal cells of the eye, which are clustered in density and fineness). Each V1 neuron propagates a signal from a retinal cell, in continuation. Furthermore, individual V1 neurons in humans and other animals with binocular vision have ocular dominance, namely tuning to one of the two eyes. In V1, and primary sensory cortex in general, neurons with similar tuning properties tend to cluster together as cortical columns. David Hubel and Torsten Wiesel proposed the classic ice-cube organization model of cortical columns for two tuning properties: ocular dominance and orientation. However, this model cannot accommodate the color, spatial frequency and many other features to which neurons are tuned. The exact organization of all these cortical columns within V1 remains a hot topic of current research.

The receptive fields of V1 neurons resemble Gabor functions, so the operation of the visual cortex has been compared to the Gabor transform.

Later in time (after 100 ms), neurons in V1 are also sensitive to the more global organisation of the scene. These response properties probably stem from recurrent feedback processing (the influence of higher-tier cortical areas on lower-tier cortical areas) and lateral connections from pyramidal neurons. While feedforward connections are mainly driving, feedback connections are mostly modulatory in their effects. Evidence shows that feedback originating in higher-level areas such as V4, IT, or MT, with bigger and more complex receptive fields, can modify and shape V1 responses, accounting for contextual or extra-classical receptive field effects.

The visual information relayed by V1 is sometimes described as edge detection. As an example, for an image comprising half side black and half side white, the dividing line between black and white has strongest local contrast (that is, edge detection) and is encoded, while few neurons code the brightness information (black or white per se). As information is further relayed to subsequent visual areas, it is coded as increasingly non-local frequency/phase signals. Note that, at these early stages of cortical visual processing, spatial location of visual information is well preserved amid the local contrast encoding (edge detection).

In primates, one role of V1 might be to create a saliency map (highlights what is important) from visual inputs to guide the shifts of attention known as gaze shifts.

According to the V1 Saliency Hypothesis, V1 does this by transforming visual inputs to neural firing rates from millions of neurons, such that the visual location signaled by the highest firing neuron is the most salient location to attract gaze shift. V1's outputs are received by the superior colliculus (in the mid-brain), among other locations, which reads out the V1 activities to guide gaze shifts.

Differences in size of V1 also seem to have an effect on the perception of illusions.

== V2 ==
Colour centre
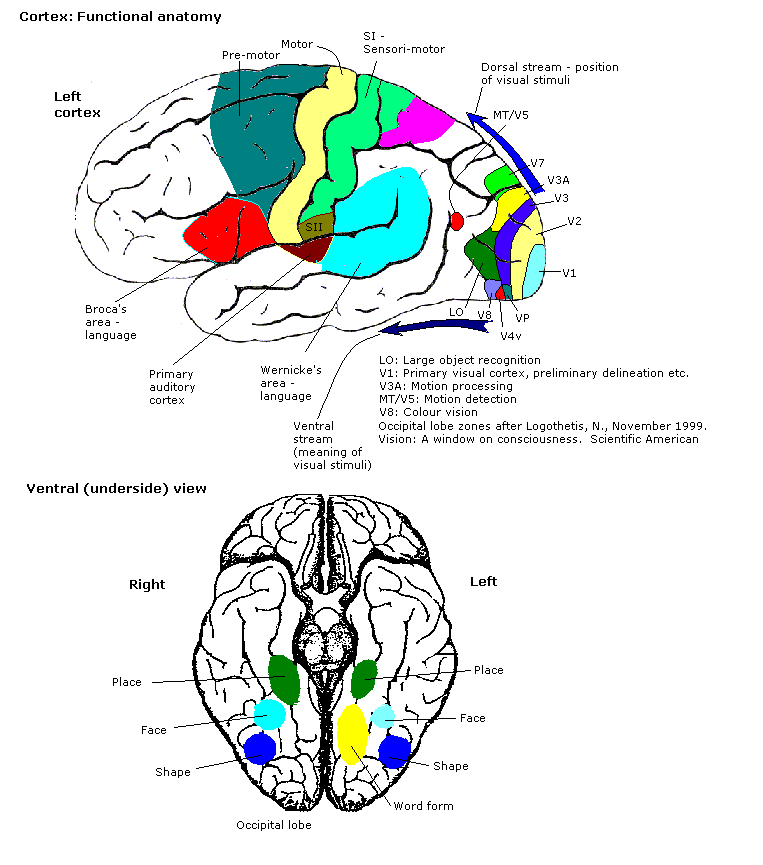
- The V-regions. More images in colour centre

Identifiers
- MeSH: D014793
- NeuroLex ID: nlx_143552
- FMA: 242644

Visual area V2, or secondary visual cortex, also called prestriate cortex, receives strong feedforward connections from V1 (direct and via the pulvinar) and sends strong connections to V3, V4, and V5. It also sends strong feedback connections to V1.

In terms of anatomy, V2 is split into four quadrants, a dorsal and ventral representation in the left and the right hemispheres. Together, these four regions provide a complete map of the visual world. V2 has many properties in common with V1: Cells are tuned to simple properties such as orientation, spatial frequency, and color. The responses of many V2 neurons are also modulated by more complex properties, such as the orientation of illusory contours, binocular disparity, and whether the stimulus is part of the figure or the ground. Recent research has shown that V2 cells show a small amount of attentional modulation (more than V1, less than V4), are tuned for moderately complex patterns, and may be driven by multiple orientations at different subregions within a single receptive field.

It is argued that the entire ventral visual-to-hippocampal stream is important for visual memory. This theory, unlike the dominant one, predicts that object-recognition memory (ORM) alterations could result from the manipulation in V2, an area that is highly interconnected within the ventral stream of visual cortices. In the monkey brain, this area receives strong feedforward connections from the primary visual cortex (V1) and sends strong projections to other secondary visual cortices (V3, V4, and V5). Most of the neurons of this area in primates are tuned to simple visual characteristics such as orientation, spatial frequency, size, color, and shape. Anatomical studies implicate layer 3 of area V2 in visual-information processing. In contrast to layer 3, layer 6 of the visual cortex is composed of many types of neurons, and their response to visual stimuli is more complex.

In one study, the Layer 6 cells of the V2 cortex were found to play a very important role in the storage of Object Recognition Memory as well as the conversion of short-term object memories into long-term memories.

== Third visual cortex, including area V3 ==
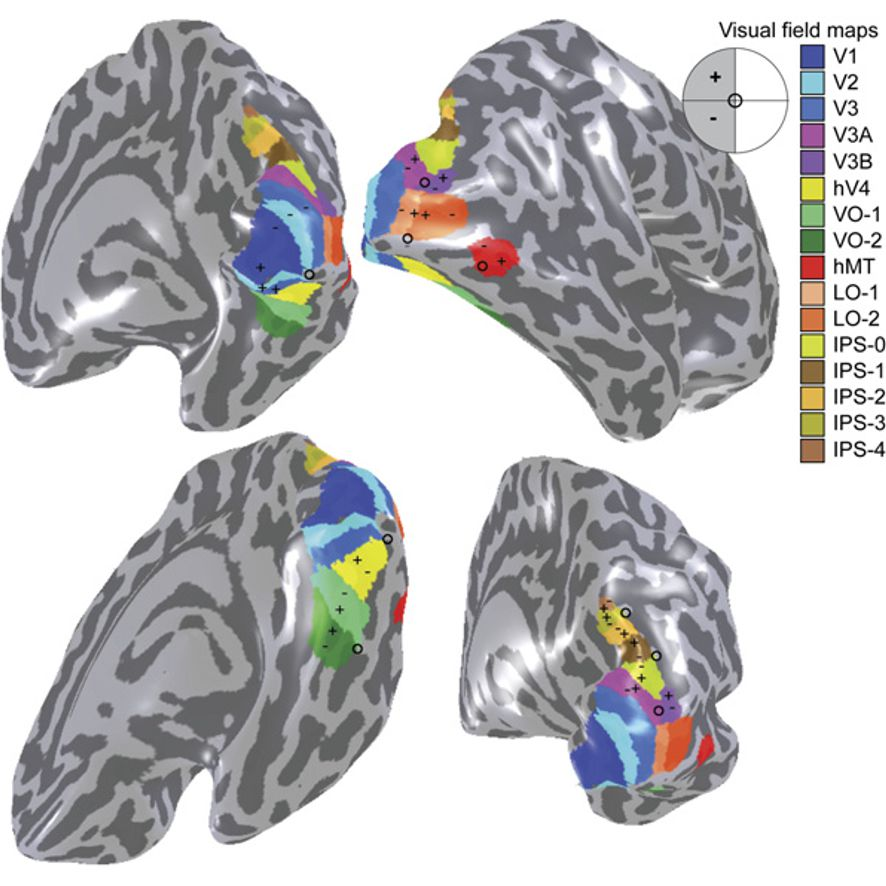
A visual field map of the primary visual cortex and the numerous extrastriate areas. More images in Colour centre

The term third visual complex refers to the region of cortex located immediately in front of V2, which includes the region named visual area V3 in humans. The "complex" nomenclature is justified by the fact that some controversy still exists regarding the exact extent of area V3, with some researchers proposing that the cortex located in front of V2 may include two or three functional subdivisions. For example, David Van Essen and others (1986) have proposed the existence of a "dorsal V3" in the upper part of the cerebral hemisphere, which is distinct from the "ventral V3" (or ventral posterior area, VP) located in the lower part of the brain. Dorsal and ventral V3 have distinct connections with other parts of the brain, appear different in sections stained with a variety of methods, and contain neurons that respond to different combinations of visual stimulus (for example, colour-selective neurons are more common in the ventral V3). Additional subdivisions, including V3A and V3B have also been reported in humans. These subdivisions are located near dorsal V3, but do not adjoin V2.

Dorsal V3 is normally considered to be part of the dorsal stream, receiving inputs from V2 and from the primary visual area and projecting to the posterior parietal cortex. It may be anatomically located in Brodmann area 19. Braddick using fMRI has suggested that area V3/V3A may play a role in the processing of global motion Other studies prefer to consider dorsal V3 as part of a larger area, named the dorsomedial area (DM), which contains a representation of the entire visual field. Neurons in area DM respond to coherent motion of large patterns covering extensive portions of the visual field (Lui and collaborators, 2006).

Ventral V3 (VP), has much weaker connections from the primary visual area, and stronger connections with the inferior temporal cortex. While earlier studies proposed that VP contained a representation of only the upper part of the visual field (above the point of fixation), more recent work indicates that this area is more extensive than previously appreciated, and like other visual areas it may contain a complete visual representation. The revised, more extensive VP is referred to as the ventrolateral posterior area (VLP) by Rosa and Tweedale.

== V4 ==
The lingual gyrus is the hypothetical location of V4 in macaque monkeys. In humans, this area is called hV4.

The fusiform gyrus is the hypothetical location of V4α, a secondary area for colour processing. More: Colour centre

Visual area V4 is one of the visual areas in the extrastriate visual cortex. In macaques, it is located anterior to V2 and posterior to the posterior inferotemporal area (PIT). It comprises at least four regions (left and right V4d, left and right V4v), and some groups report that it contains rostral and caudal subdivisions as well. It is unknown whether the human V4 is as expansive as that of the macaque homologue. This is a subject of debate.

V4 is the third cortical area in the ventral stream, receiving strong feedforward input from V2 and sending strong connections to the PIT. It also receives direct input from V1, especially for central space. In addition, it has weaker connections to V5 and the dorsal prelunate gyrus (DP).

V4 is the first area in the ventral stream to show strong attentional modulation. Most studies indicate that selective attention can change firing rates in V4 by about 20%. A seminal paper by Moran and Desimone characterizing these effects was the first paper to find attention effects anywhere in the visual cortex.

Like V2, V4 is tuned for orientation, spatial frequency, and color. Unlike V2, V4 is tuned for object features of intermediate complexity, like simple geometric shapes, although no one has developed a full parametric description of the tuning space for V4. Visual area V4 is not tuned for complex objects such as faces, as areas in the inferotemporal cortex are.

The firing properties of V4 were first described by Semir Zeki in the late 1970s, who also named the area. Before that, V4 was known by its anatomical description, the prelunate gyrus. Originally, Zeki argued that the purpose of V4 was to process color information. Work in the early 1980s proved that V4 was as directly involved in form recognition as earlier cortical areas. This research supported the two-streams hypothesis, first presented by Ungerleider and Mishkin in 1982.

Recent work has shown that V4 exhibits long-term plasticity, encodes stimulus salience, is gated by signals coming from the frontal eye fields, and shows changes in the spatial profile of its receptive fields with attention. In addition, it has recently been shown that activation of area V4 in humans (area V4h) is observed during the perception and retention of the color of objects, but not their shape.

== Middle temporal visual area (V5) ==
The middle temporal visual area (MT or V5) is a region of extrastriate visual cortex. In several species of both New World monkeys and Old World monkeys the MT area contains a high concentration of direction-selective neurons. The MT in primates is thought to play a major role in the perception of motion, the integration of local motion signals into global percepts, and the guidance of some eye movements.

=== Connections ===
MT is connected to a wide array of cortical and subcortical brain areas. Its input comes from visual cortical areas V1, V2 and dorsal V3 (dorsomedial area), the koniocellular regions of the LGN, and the inferior pulvinar. The pattern of projections to MT changes somewhat between the representations of the foveal and peripheral visual fields, with the latter receiving inputs from areas located in the midline cortex and retrosplenial region.

A standard view is that V1 provides the "most important" input to MT. Nonetheless, several studies have demonstrated that neurons in MT are capable of responding to visual information, often in a direction-selective manner, even after V1 has been destroyed or inactivated. Moreover, research by Semir Zeki and collaborators has suggested that certain types of visual information may reach MT before it even reaches V1.

MT sends its major output to areas located in the cortex immediately surrounding it, including areas FST, MST, and V4t (middle temporal crescent). Other projections of MT target the eye movement-related areas of the frontal and parietal lobes (frontal eye field and lateral intraparietal area).

=== Function ===
The first studies of the electrophysiological properties of neurons in MT showed that a large portion of the cells are tuned to the speed and direction of moving visual stimuli.

Lesion studies have also supported the role of MT in motion perception and eye movements. Neuropsychological studies of a patient unable to see motion, seeing the world in a series of static 'frames' instead, suggested that V5 in the primate is homologous to MT in the human.

However, since neurons in V1 are also tuned to the direction and speed of motion, these early results left open the question of precisely what MT could do that V1 could not. Much work has been carried out on this region, as it appears to integrate local visual motion signals into the global motion of complex objects. For example, lesion to the V5 leads to deficits in perceiving motion and processing of complex stimuli. It contains many neurons selective for the motion of complex visual features (line ends, corners). Microstimulation of a neuron located in the V5 affects the perception of motion. For example, if one finds a neuron with preference for upward motion in a monkey's V5 and stimulates it with an electrode, then the monkey becomes more likely to report 'upward' motion when presented with stimuli containing 'left' and 'right' as well as 'upward' components.

There is still much controversy over the exact form of the computations carried out in area MT and some research suggests that feature motion is in fact already available at lower levels of the visual system such as V1.

=== Functional organization ===
MT was shown to be organized in direction columns. DeAngelis argued that MT neurons were also organized based on their tuning for binocular disparity.

== V6 ==
The dorsomedial area (DM) also known as V6, appears to respond to visual stimuli associated with self-motion and wide-field stimulation. V6 is a subdivision of the visual cortex of primates first described by John Allman and Jon Kaas in 1975. V6 is located in the dorsal part of the extrastriate cortex, near the deep groove through the centre of the brain (medial longitudinal fissure), and typically also includes portions of the medial cortex, such as the parieto-occipital sulcus (POS). DM contains a topographically organized representation of the entire field of vision.

There are similarities between the visual area V5 and V6 of the common marmoset. Both areas receive direct connections from the primary visual cortex. And both have a high myelin content, a characteristic that is usually present in brain structures involved in fast transmission of information.

For many years, it was considered that DM only existed in New World monkeys. However, more recent research has suggested that DM also exists in Old World monkeys and humans. V6 is also sometimes referred to as the parieto-occipital area (PO), although the correspondence is not exact.

=== Properties ===
Neurons in area DM/V6 of night monkeys and common marmosets have unique response properties, including an extremely sharp selectivity for the orientation of visual contours, and preference for long, uninterrupted lines covering large parts of the visual field.

However, in comparison with area MT, a much smaller proportion of DM cells shows selectivity for the direction of motion of visual patterns. Another notable difference with area MT is that cells in DM are attuned to low spatial frequency components of an image, and respond poorly to the motion of textured patterns such as a field of random dots. These response properties suggest that DM and MT may work in parallel, with the former analyzing self-motion relative to the environment, and the latter analyzing the motion of individual objects relative to the background.

Recently, an area responsive to wide-angle flow fields has been identified in the human and is thought to be a homologue of macaque area V6.

=== Pathways ===

The connections and response properties of cells in DM/V6 suggest that this area is a key node in a subset of the "dorsal stream", referred to by some as the "dorsomedial pathway". This pathway is likely to be important for the control of skeletomotor activity, including postural reactions and reaching movements towards objects The main 'feedforward' connection of DM is to the cortex immediately rostral to it, in the interface between the occipital and parietal lobes (V6A). This region has, in turn, relatively direct connections with the regions of the frontal lobe that control arm movements, including the premotor cortex.

== See also ==
- Cortical area
- Cortical blindness
- Feature integration theory
- List of regions in the human brain
- Retinotopy
- Visual processing
- Complex cell
