= Joseph Delboeuf =

Belgian experimental psychologist (1831-1896)

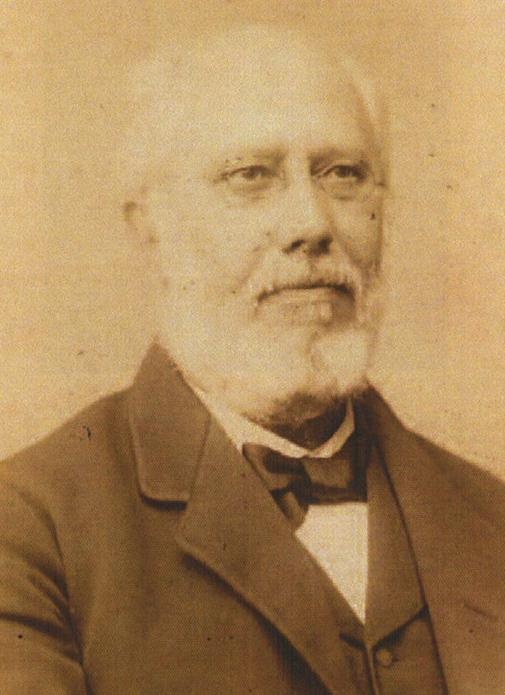
Joseph Delboeuf (1891)

Joseph Rémi Léopold Delbœuf (30 September 1831, Liège, Belgium – 14 August 1896, Bonn, Germany) was a Belgian experimental psychologist who studied visual illusions including his work on the Delboeuf illusion. He studied and taught philosophy, mathematics, and psychophysics. He published works across a diverse range of subjects including the curative effects of hypnotism.

== Early life and education ==
Joseph Delboeuf was born in the French speaking town of Liège, Belgium. His father, a pewter craftsman, died early in Delboeuf’s life. He studied at the University of Liège, earning his PhD in philosophy in 1855, followed by physics and mathematics in 1858. He received a scholarship from the University of Bonn and continued his postdoctoral research under philosopher and mathematician Friedrich Ueberweg. In 1860, he began teaching Greek at l’Ecole Normale des Humanités de Liège. In 1863, he was given the post of Maitre de Conférences, which he only held for a few months before being appointed Chair of Philosophy at University of Ghent, leaving his research in mathematics. There, he met Joseph Plateau, who helped him publish his first two notes on optical illusions in the Bulletin of the Royal Academy of Belgium. He then began his research in psychophysics with Gustav Fechner in 1865.

== Work ==
Delboeuf began his psychophysical experimentation on brightness in 1865 with Gustav Fechner. Delboeuf introduced the concept of sense distance (contraste sensible).

Delboeuf is known for his description of the Delboeuf illusion in 1893. Many experiments have been performed on this illusion since that time.

=== Hypnotism ===
After completing work on sleep and dreams, Delboeuf started researching magnetism and hypnotism. At the First International Congress on scientific and experimental hypnotism (1889), a motion was put forward to ban non-medical practitioners from using hypnosis. However, Delboeuf argued that a medical degree was not required to practice hypnotism; rather, it should be used freely, yet with caution. Along with a group of magnetizers in Verviers, he argued that hypnotists had specific personal skills that could not be acquired by all doctors. Thus, the clinical technique of hypnotism was proposed as an alternative to traditional medical therapies.

==== Curative effects ====
Most of the work Delboeuf published was on the curative effects of hypnotism. However, his hypotheses were often difficult to test and falsify. To test his hypotheses, he suggested that he would need two identical patients to be treated with different approaches. Instead, he used the symmetry of the opposite sides of the body. He would make two identical lesions on two parts of the body (e.g., arms) and would apply hypnotism to one area while leaving the other alone for nature to act upon. He found that not only can the consequences of pain be avoided from hypnotic suggestion (i.e., no pain experienced), but that over the course of the injury or disease, the actual effects of the operation could be halted over time. Hypnotism's mode of action, concluded Delboeuf, is like pain, in that it "hypnotizes" by calling attention to itself. Thus, hypnotic suggestion prevents the effects of pain by withdrawing attention from it.

==== Post hypnotic suggestion ====
Delboeuf, with Hippolyte Bernheim in 1885, introduced a new solution to the problem of post hypnotic suggestion. They argued that subjects drifted into a dream-like state in which they became aware of the suggestion and time remaining in this state. Their idea was very similar to a double consciousness theory suggested by Pierre Janet. They highlighted that subjects are unable to remember the suggestion when they wake because the memory is only available in the dream-like or hypnotic state. In other words, they describe the memory being in a “dormant” state that returns during the hypnotic state. Delboeuf argued that the amnesia from waking from hypnotic sleep was similar to that from waking up from regular sleep. We tend not to remember our dreams because we are unable to establish a connection between the waking and dream state. We do, however, tend to remember dreams when we wake up in the middle of a dream because our waking and dreaming state bridge together. Therefore, Delboeuf predicted that subjects should be able to recall their hypnotic sleep if they were awakened in the middle of it. He tested his predictions in an experiment with Marie Wittman, who was awakened in the middle of a hypnotic hallucination and remembered everything. Delboeuf repeated his experiment with other subjects with similar results. His experiments convinced him of the similarity between normal dreams and hypnotic states.

=== Mathematics ===
During his time at the University of Bonn, Delboeuf published Prolégomènes philosophiques à la géométrie (1860), disputing his mentor Ueberweg’s concept of Euclidean space and earning the praise of Bertrand Russell. He argued that, in order to use geometry to find the fundamental qualities of “determinations of space,” we must first understand the concepts of both “determination” and “space.” In this paper, he independently discovered Euclidean postulate 5. Postulate 5 states that, if a line intersects two straight lines that together form two interior angles on the same side that sum to less than 180 degrees, then the two straight lines must meet on that side.

==== Psychophysics ====
Delboeuf first conducted psychophysics experiments at the University of Gand (1855-1866). He primarily worked on Weber's Law (proposed by Fechner):

$$S = K \log I$$

Where S stands for the strength of a sensation, I stands for the intensity of an external stimulus, and K is a constant.

Delboeuf proposed two main changes to Fechner's formula. The first change was related to mathematical aspects. Delboeuf argued that, in some cases, Fechner's formula would result in negative values for S. For example if $I = 0$, then $S < 0$. Delboeuf proposed that, because a negative value of S did not make sense, the formula could not be applicable to all cases. For example, in cases where the strength of a sensation may lead to inability to view an external stimulus (for instance due to glare), the formula would not be applicable. To address this issue, Delbeouf added a term to the end of Fechner's equation:

$$S = K \log \frac{I + c}{c}$$

Where c stands for the baseline physiological level of excitation within the senses.

Delboeuf's second change to Fechner's formula was the addition of a supplementary equation:

$$f = \log \frac{m}{m - I'}$$

Where f stands for the amount of fatigue from effort of the sense organ given a stimulus, m stands for the amount of available sensitivity of the organ, and I' stands for the intensity of the stimulus. This supplementary equation would account for the change that a sense organ experiences due to the magnitude of excitation from an external stimulus. By adding this equation, Delboeuf accounted for fatiguing effects that sensations have on sense organs.

==== General Theory of Sensitivity ====
Delboeuf investigated the laws of nature and sensation in his paper "General Theory of Sensitivity." Delboeuf proposed that a sensation consists of two aspects: (1) formation of the sensation and (2) how sense organs function. Delboeuf further proposed three laws that can be applied to determine sensation strength:

1. Law of Degradation: as soon as a sensation occurs, the strength of a sensation begins to degrade.

2. Law of Intensity: in order for a sensation to increase in strength, it must be stimulated by excitations that are also increasing in magnitude.

3. Law of Tension: as the strength of a sensation increases, the level of tension also increases. Tension is associated with unpleasantness, pain, fatigue and even the destruction of the sensation itself.

=== Visual illusions ===
Delboeuf illusion (1865)

Delboeuf started researching perception after meeting Joseph Plateau (1801-1883), a physicist known for his work on vision. After this encounter, Delboeuf changed his focus from Fechnerian psychophysics to the psychology of perception. His first work on illusions was a discussion of Zollner's Pseudoscopy (1865) in which he proposes a theory that all optical illusions could be explained by the muscular strength and structure of the eye. He went on to publish a work on Optico-Geometric Illusions, in which he reinforces his proposed theory. These works led Delboeuf to develop an experiment on an optico-geometric illusion that later became known as the Delboeuf illusion (1865). This illusion is based on the idea that stimuli can be perceived as larger or smaller based on their illumination and surroundings. Delboeuf is well known for his work on this illusion. Later in his career, he published an explanation of the Muller-Lyer Illusion in terms of eye movements instead of the mis-estimation of angles theory Brentano had published. Many studies have been conducted on the Delboeuf illusion (1865) since the publication of his original study, and many explanations for this illusion have been put forth.

== Works ==
- De la moralité en littérature (1861)
- De la psychologie comme science naturelle, son présent et son avenir (1875)
- Le sommeil et les rêves (1885)
- La mémoire chez les hypnotisés (1886)
- De l'influence de l'éducation et de l'imitation (1886)
- Une Visite à la Salpêtrière (1886)
- De la prétendue veille somnambulique (1887)
- Magnétisme: À propos d'une Visite À L'Écold de Nancy (1889)
- comme Quoi il n'y a pas d'hypnoitisme (1891)
- Quelques Considérations sur la Psychologie de l'Hypnotisme (1892)
- Note sur certaines illusions d'optique; essai d'une theorie psychophysique de la maniere dont l'oeil apprecie les distances et les angles (1865)
- Seconde note sur de nouvelles illusions d'optique: Essai d'une theorie psychophysique de la maniere dont l'oeil apprecie les grandeurs (1865)
- Etude psychophysique. Recherches theoriques et experimentales sur la mesure des sensations et specialement des sensations de lumiere et de fatigue Memoires couronnes et autres memoires publies par l'Academie Royale des Sciences, des Lettres et des Beaux-Arts de Belgique (1873)
- La mesure des sensations (I): Reponses a propos du logarithme des sensations (1875)
- Analyse du memoire: Theorie generale de la sensibilite (1875)
- Theorie generale de la sensibilite Memoires couronnes et autres memoires publies par l'Academie Royale des Sciences, des Lettres et des Beaux-Arts de Belgique (1876)
- La psychologie comme science naturelle: Son present et son avenir (1876)
- La loi psycho-physique: Hering contre Fechner (1877)
- La loi psychophysique et le nouveau livre de Fechner (1878)
- Elements de psychophysique generale et speciale (1883)
- Examen critique de la loi psychophysique: Sa base et sa signification (1883)

=== Articles in Popular Science Monthly ===
- "Dwarfs and Giants" . Popular Science Monthly. Vol. 22. April 1883.
- "What May Animals Be Taught?" . Popular Science Monthly. Vol. 29. June 1886.
- "The Psychology of Lizards" . Popular Science Monthly. Vol. 43. September 1893.
- "Affections and Jealousies of Lizards" . Popular Science Monthly. Vol. 50. January 1897.
- "In a World Half as Large" . Popular Science Monthly. Vol. 52. March 1898.

== See also ==
- The Salpêtrière School of Hypnosis
