= Ebbinghaus illusion =

Optical illusion

The two orange circles are exactly the same size; however, the one on the right appears larger.

The Ebbinghaus illusion or Titchener circles is an optical illusion of relative size perception. Named for its discoverer, the German psychologist Hermann Ebbinghaus (1850–1909), the illusion was popularized in the English-speaking world by Edward B. Titchener in a 1901 textbook of experimental psychology, hence its alternative name. In the best-known version of the illusion, two circles of identical size are placed near each other, and one is surrounded by large circles while the other is surrounded by small circles. As a result of the juxtaposition of circles, the central circle surrounded by large circles appears smaller than the central circle surrounded by small circles.

Recent work suggests that two other critical factors involved in the perception of the Ebbinghaus illusion are the distance of the surrounding circles from the central circle and the completeness of the annulus, which makes the illusion comparable in nature to the Delboeuf illusion. Regardless of relative size, if the surrounding circles are closer to the central circle, the central circle appears larger and if the surrounding circles are far away, the central circle appears smaller. While the distance variable appears to be an active factor in the perception of relative size, the size of the surrounding circles limits how close they can be to the central circle, resulting in many studies confounding the two variables.

== Possible explanations ==
The Ebbinghaus illusion has played a crucial role in the debate over the existence of separate pathways in the brain for perception and action (for more details see Two Streams hypothesis). It has been argued that the Ebbinghaus illusion distorts perception of size, but not action. A study by neuroscientist Melvyn A. Goodale showed that when a subject is required to respond to a physical model of the illusion by grasping the central circle, the scaling of the grip aperture was unaffected by the perceived size distortion. While other studies confirm the insensitivity of grip scaling to size-contrast illusions like the Ebbinghaus illusion, other work suggests that both action and perception are fooled by the illusion.

Neuroimaging research suggests an inverse correlation between an individual's receptivity to the Ebbinghaus and similar illusions (such as the Ponzo illusion) and the highly variable size of the individual's primary visual cortex. Developmental research suggests that the illusion is dependent on context-sensitivity. The illusion was found more often to cause relative-size deception in university students, who have high context-sensitivity, than in children aged 10 and under.

Study found 70 genetic variants linked to the perception of the Ebbinghaus illusion.

The winner of the 2014 Best Illusion of the Year Contest, submitted by Christopher D. Blair, Gideon P. Caplovitz, and Ryan E.B. Mruczek, of the University of Nevada, Reno, animated the Ebbinghaus illusion, putting it in motion.

== An exception with opposite visual effects ==
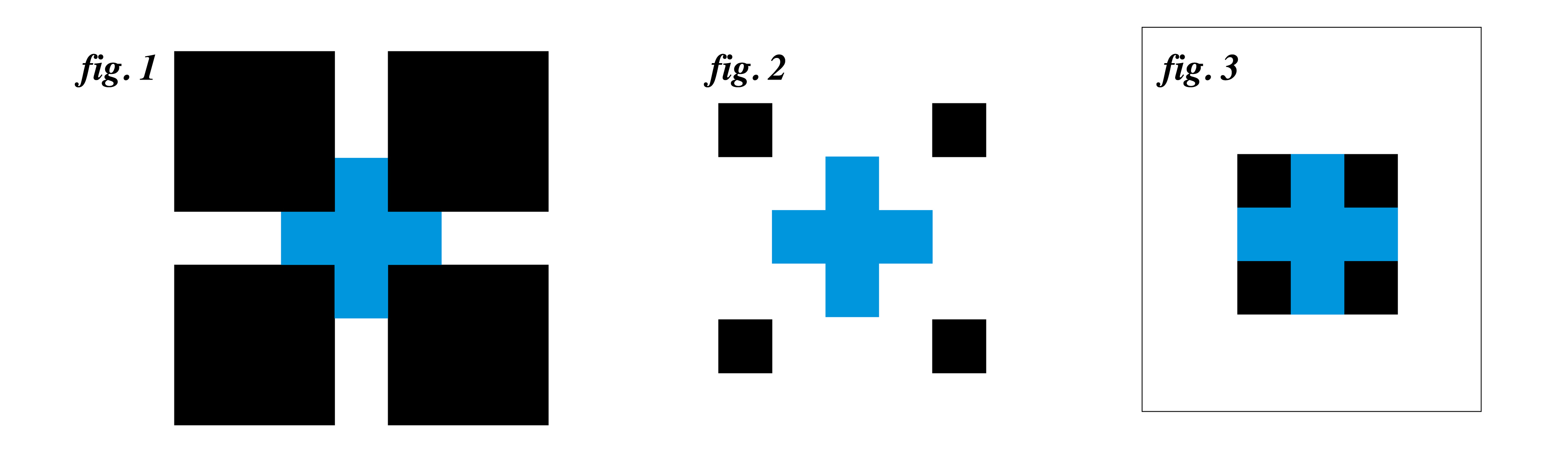
The three blue crosses are exactly the same size; however, the one on the left (fig. 1) tends to appear larger.

A new relative size illusion was discovered by Italian visual researcher Gianni A. Sarcone in 2013. It contradicts the Ebbinghaus illusion (1898) and the Obonai square illusion (1954). In fact, the central test shape (a cross) surrounded by large squares appears larger instead of smaller.

Sarcone's Cross illusion consists of a cross (the test shape) surrounded by sets of squares of distinct size (the inducing shapes). As shown in the diagram opposite, the three blue crosses are exactly the same size; however, the one on the left (fig. 1) tends to appear larger. The illusion works even when the small squares completely occlude the blue cross (see fig. 3). In conclusion, there isn't always correlation between the size of the surrounding shapes and the relative size perception of the test shape.
