= Ponzo illusion =

Geometrical-optical illusion

The Ponzo illusion is a geometrical-optical illusion that takes its name from the Italian psychologist Mario Ponzo (1882–1960).

Two identical horizontal lines placed on vertical converging lines will appear to be of different lengths.

An example of the Ponzo illusion. Both of the horizontal yellow lines are the same length.

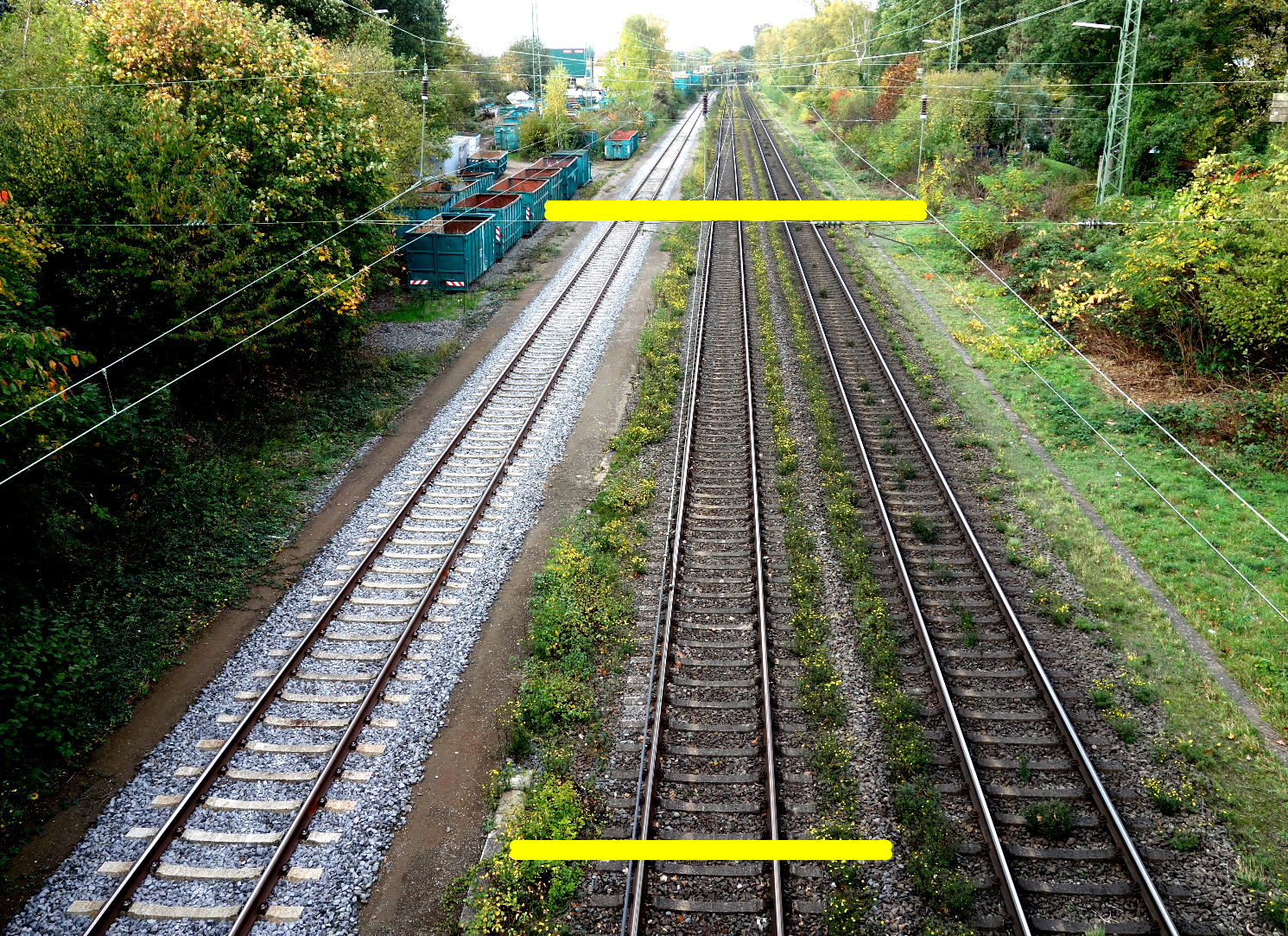
The Ponzo illusion in a real situation.

Ponzo never claimed to have discovered it, and it is indeed present in earlier work. Much confusion is present about this including many references to a paper that Ponzo published in 1910 on the Aristotle illusion. This is a tactile effect and it has nothing at all to do with what we now call the Ponzo illusion. The illusion can be demonstrated by drawing two identical lines across a pair of converging lines, similar to railway tracks, but the effect works also at different orientations.

One of the explanations for the Ponzo illusion is the "perspective hypothesis", which says that the perspective feature in the figure is produced by the converging lines ordinarily associated with distance; the two oblique lines appear to converge toward the horizon or a vanishing point. We interpret the upper line as though it were further away, so we see it as longer. A further object would have to be longer than a nearer one for both to produce retinal images of the same size.

Another explanation is the "framing-effects hypothesis", which says that the difference in the separation or gap of the horizontal lines from the framing converging lines may determine, or at least contribute to the magnitude of the distortion.

The Ponzo illusion is one possible explanation of the Moon illusion, as suggested by Ponzo in 1912. Objects appearing "far away" (because they are "on" the horizon) appear larger than objects "overhead". However, some have argued that explaining one perception ("appears far away") in terms of another ("appears bigger") is problematic scientifically, and there are probably complex internal processes behind these illusions.

The Ponzo illusion also occurs in touch and with an auditory-to-visual sensory-substitution device. However, prior visual experience seems to be a necessary component of perceiving it, as demonstrated by the fact that congenitally blind subjects are not sensitive to it.

The Ponzo illusion has been used to demonstrate a dissociation between vision-for-perception and vision-for-action. Thus, the scaling of grasping movements directed towards objects embedded within a Ponzo illusion is not subject to the size illusion. In other words, the opening between the index finger and thumb is scaled to the real not the apparent size of the target object as the grasping hand approaches it.

Cross-cultural differences in susceptibility to the Ponzo illusion have been noted, with non-Western and rural people showing less susceptibility. Other recent research suggests that an individual's receptivity to this illusion, as well as the Ebbinghaus illusion, may be inversely correlated with the size of the individual's primary visual cortex.
