= Moon illusion =

Perceived variation in the Moon's size

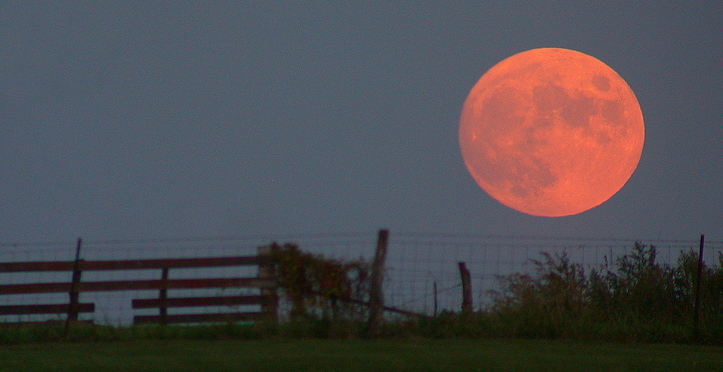
When the Moon is close above the horizon, the Moon illusion may cause it to appear larger, and Rayleigh scattering can impart a red color.

Two Moons simulated above a skyline, the Moon above the distant buildings (right) looks larger than the Moon above the nearby ones (left).

The Moon illusion is the optical illusion of the Moon appearing larger near the horizon than it does higher up in the sky. It has been known since ancient times and recorded by various cultures.

The illusion is seen also with other celestial objects (such as in a sunset or sunrise, and constellations) and remains inconclusively explained, with the ponzo illusion as a popular explanation.

== Proof of illusion ==
The Moon is actually only about 1.5% farther away and thus smaller in angular size when at the horizon than when above.

The angle that the diameter of the full Moon subtends at an observer's eye can be measured directly with a theodolite to show that it remains constant as the Moon rises or sinks in the sky. Photographs of the Moon at different elevations also show that its size remains the same. A simple way of demonstrating that the effect is an illusion is to hold a small pebble (say, 0.33 inches or 8.4 millimetres wide) at arm's length (25 inches or 64 centimetres) with one eye closed, positioning the pebble so that it covers (eclipses) the full Moon when high in the night sky. Then, when the seemingly very large Moon is on the horizon, the same pebble will also cover it, revealing that there has been no change in the size of the Moon.

Across different full moons, the Moon's angular diameter can vary from 29.43 arcminutes at apogee to 33.5 arcminutes at perigee—a variation of around 14% in apparent diameter or 30% in apparent area. This is because of the eccentricity of the Moon's orbit.

== Possible explanations ==
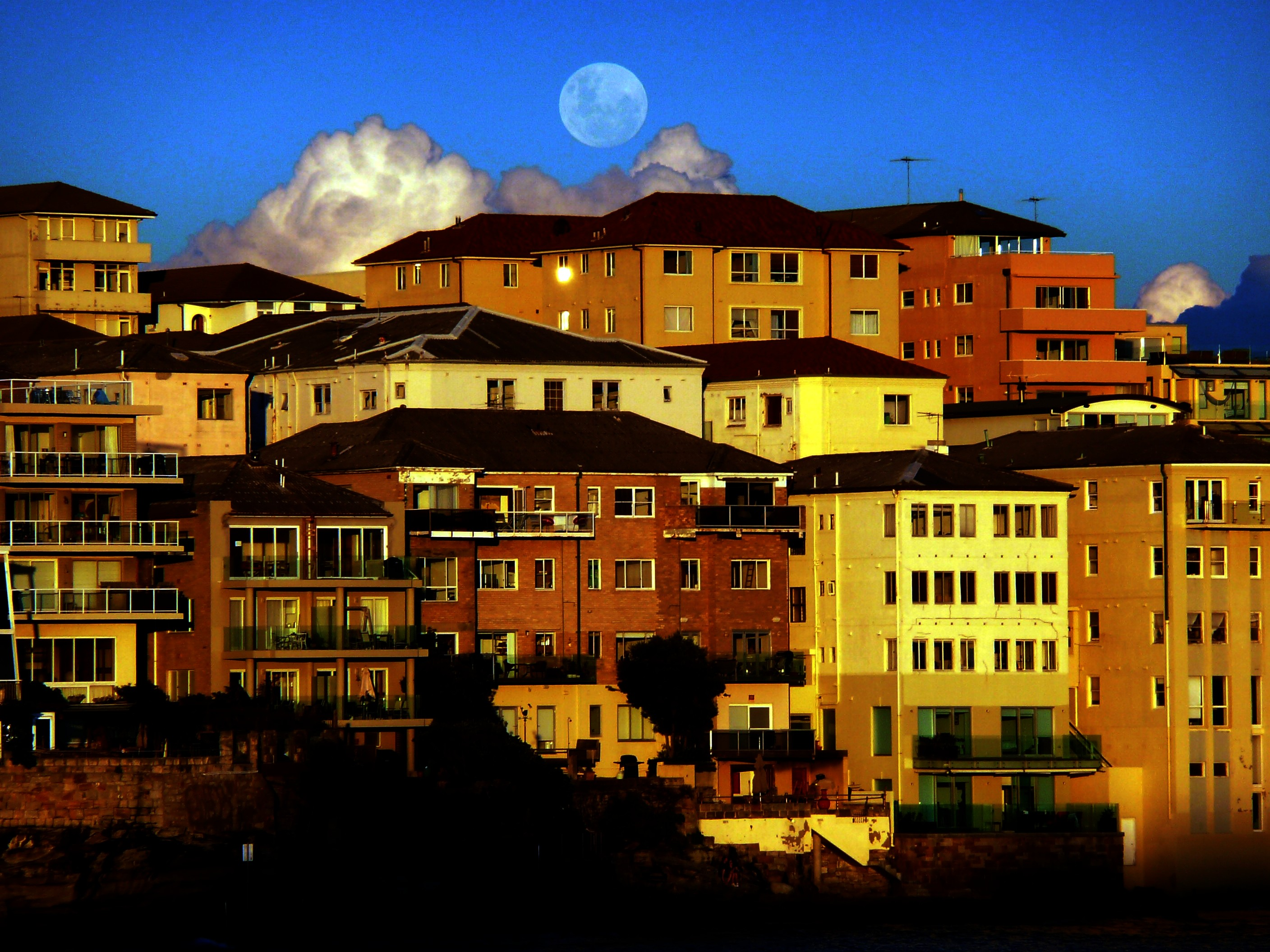
Moon above low-rise apartments in Bondi, Australia

The size of a viewed object can be measured objectively either as an angular size (the visual angle that it subtends at the eye, corresponding to the proportion of the visual field that it occupies), or as physical size (its real size measured in, say, meters). Perceived size is only loosely related to these concepts, however. For example, if two identical, familiar objects are placed at distances of five and ten meters, respectively, then the more distant object subtends approximately half the visual angle of the nearer object, but it is normally perceived to be the same size (a phenomenon referred to as size constancy), not as half the size. Conversely, if the more distant object did subtend the same angle as the nearer object then it is normally perceived to be twice as big.

One question concerning the Moon illusion, therefore, is whether the horizon Moon appears larger because its perceived angular size seems greater, or because its perceived physical size seems greater, or some combination of both. There is currently no consensus on this point. Most recent research on the Moon illusion has been conducted by psychologists specializing in human perception. The 2013 book The Moon Illusion, edited by Hershenson, offers 19 chapters written by various illusion researchers reaching different conclusions. After reviewing the many different explanations in their 2002 book The Mystery of the Moon Illusion, Ross and Plug conclude "No single theory has emerged victorious." They argue that the size of the illusion is variable, but is usually an apparent increase in diameter of about 50 percent. The most important factor is the sight of the terrain, but there is a small contribution from other factors such as the angle of regard, posture, and eye movements.

=== Refraction and Distance ===
Ptolemy attempted to explain the Moon illusion through atmospheric refraction in the Almagest, and later (in the Optics) as an optical illusion due to apparent distance, or the difficulty of looking upwards, although interpretations of the account in the Optics are disputed. Similarly Cleomedes (about 200 A.D.), in his book on astronomy, ascribed the illusion both to refraction and to changes in apparent distance. In the Book of Optics (1011–1022 A.D.), Ibn al-Haytham (Alhazen) repeated refraction as an explanation, but also proposed a more detailed explanation based on intervening objects and apparent distance.

Through additional works (by Roger Bacon, John Pecham, Witelo, and others) based on Ibn al-Haytham's explanation, the Moon illusion came to be accepted as a psychological phenomenon in the 17th century.

=== Apparent distance hypothesis ===
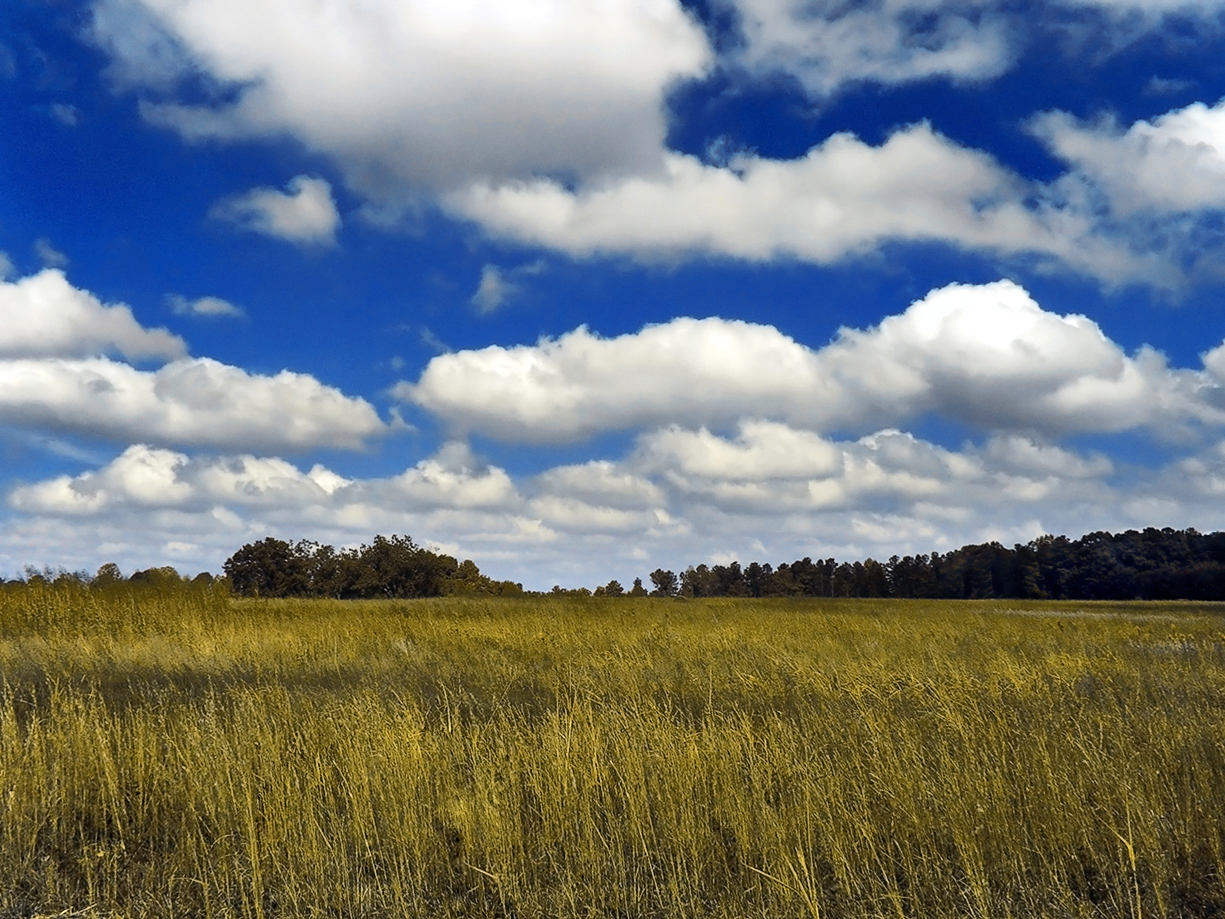
Clouds near the horizon are typically further away from the viewer, while those high in the sky are closer, giving the impression of a flat, or gently curved, sky surface.

An apparent distance theory evidently was first clearly described by Cleomedes around 200 A.D. The theory proposes that the horizon Moon looks larger than the zenith Moon because it looks further away. Ibn al-Haytham was more specific: his argument was that judging the distance of an object depends on there being an uninterrupted sequence of intervening bodies between the object and the observer; however, since there are no intervening objects between the Earth and the Moon, the perceived distance is too short and the Moon appears smaller than on the horizon. Researchers have argued that the apparent distance hypothesis is problematic scientifically because it explains perceptions as consequences of perceptions: the Moon looks larger because it looks further away. However, there are probably complex internal processes behind this relationship.

In 1813, Schopenhauer wrote about this, that the Moon illusion is "purely intellectual or cerebral and not optical or sensuous." The brain takes the sense data that is given to it from the eye and it apprehends a large Moon because "our intuitively perceiving understanding regards everything that is seen in a horizontal direction as being more distant and therefore as being larger than objects that are seen in a vertical direction." The brain is accustomed to seeing terrestrially-sized objects in a horizontal direction and also as they are affected by atmospheric perspective, according to Schopenhauer.

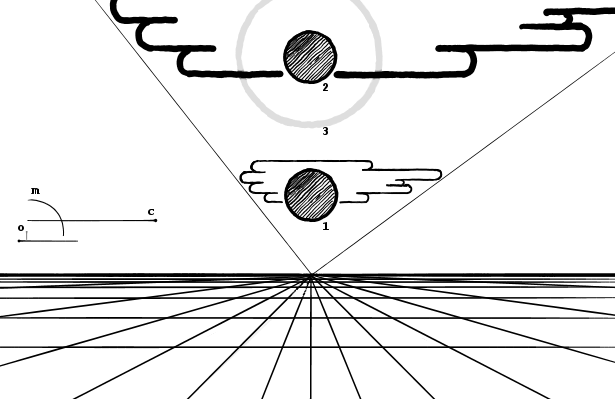
A diagram of the Moon seen against a cloud of the same size, at different heights in the sky. When the Moon is high, the clouds it is against are closer to the viewer and appear larger. When the Moon is low in the sky, the same clouds are farther away and appear smaller, giving the illusion of a larger Moon.

If the Moon is perceived to be in the general vicinity of the other things seen in the sky, it would be expected to also recede as it approaches the horizon, which should result in a smaller retinal image. But since its retinal image is approximately the same size whether it is near the horizon or not, the brain, attempting to compensate for perspective, assumes that a low Moon must be physically larger.

Extensive experiments in 1962 by Kaufman and Rock showed that a crucial causative factor in the illusion is a change in the pattern of cues to distance, comparable to the Ponzo illusion. The horizon Moon is perceived to be at the end of a stretch of terrain receding into the distance, accompanied by distant trees, buildings and so forth, all of which indicate that it must be a long way away, while these cues are absent from the zenith moon. Experiments by many other researchers have found the same result; namely, when pictorial cues to a great distance are subtracted from the vista of the large-looking horizon Moon it looks smaller. When pictorial cues to an increased distance are added into the vista of the zenith Moon, it appears larger.

A potential problem for the apparent distance theory has been that few people (perhaps about 5%) perceive the horizon Moon as being both larger and further away. Indeed, most people (perhaps 90%) say the horizon Moon looks both larger and closer than the zenith Moon (Boring, 1962; Hershenson, 1982; McCready, 1965, 1986; Restle, 1970). Most of the rest say it looks larger and about the same distance away as the zenith Moon, with a few people reporting no Moon illusion at all. However, the response that the horizon Moon appears larger, but not closer than the zenith Moon could be because the viewer's logic confounds their perception; because the viewer knows that the Moon can't possibly be physically further away, they are not consciously aware of the perception. This is reinforced by the idea that the brain does not consciously perceive distance and size, as spatial awareness is a subconscious, retino cortical cognition. In line with the possibility that the reported distance of the Moon is due to logic, rather than perception, is the finding that these varying reports—with some reporting closer distances and others not—are likely due to response biases. Nevertheless, the apparent distance explanation is the one most often found in textbooks.

=== Relative size hypothesis ===
The Ebbinghaus illusion. The lower central circle surrounded by small circles might represent the horizon Moon accompanied by objects of smaller visual extent, while the upper central circle represents the zenith Moon surrounded by expanses of sky of larger visual extent. Although both central circles are actually the same size, the lower one looks larger to many people.

Historically, the best-known alternative to the "apparent distance" theory has been a "relative size" theory. This states that the perceived size of an object depends not only on its retinal size, but also on the size of objects in its immediate visual environment. In the case of the Moon illusion, objects in the vicinity of the horizon Moon (that is, objects on or near the horizon) exhibit a fine detail that makes the Moon appear larger, while the zenith Moon is surrounded by large expanses of empty sky that make it appear smaller.

The effect is illustrated by the classic Ebbinghaus illusion, where a circle appears larger when surrounded by smaller circles, than it does when surrounded by larger circles.

=== Angle of regard hypothesis ===
According to the "angle of regard" hypothesis, the Moon illusion is produced by changes in the position of the eyes in the head accompanying changes in the angle of elevation of the Moon. Though once popular, this explanation no longer has much support. Looking through one's legs at the horizon Moon does reduce the illusion noticeably, but this may be because the image on the retina is inverted. Raising the eyes or tilting the head when in an upright posture gives only a very small reduction in the illusion.

== Historical references ==
Immanuel Kant refers to the Moon illusion in his 1781 text Critique of Pure Reason, when he writes that "the astronomer cannot prevent himself from seeing the moon larger at its rising than some time afterwards, although he is not deceived by this illusion". Schopenhauer (1813) was cited above. Wade shortly summarizes historical references to the moon illusion starting with Aristotle; he lists quotes by Aristotle (~330 BC), Ptolemy (~142, 150), Ibn al-Haytham (Alhazen) (1083), John Pecham (~1280), Leonardo da Vinci (~1500), René Descartes (1637), Benedetto Castelli (1639), Pierre Gassendi (1642), Thomas Hobbes (1655), J. Rohault (1671), Nicolas Malebranche (1674), William Molyneux (1687), J. Wallis (1687), George Berkeley (1709), J. T. Desaguliers (1736), W. Porterfield (1737), R. Smith (1738), C. N. Le Cat (1744), D. Hartley (1749), Thomas Young (1807), and Carl Friedrich Gauss (1830).
