= Assimilation and contrast effects =

Cognitive biases

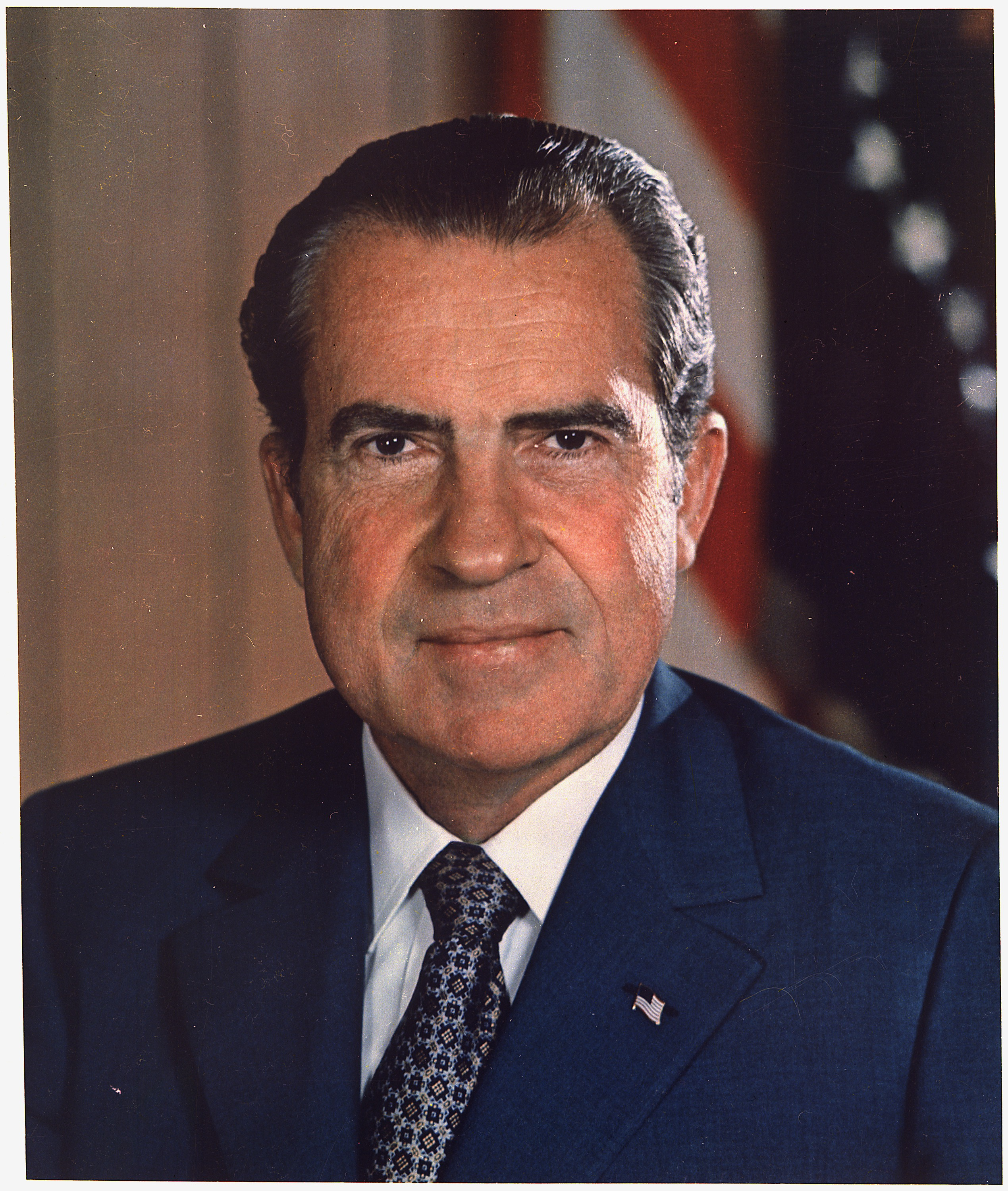
Thinking about Trump, a politician strongly associated with scandals, decreases the perceived trustworthiness of politicians in general (assimilation effect), but increases the perceived trustworthiness of every other specific politician assessed (contrast effect).

Assimilation and contrast effects describe cognitive biases in how individuals perceive and evaluate stimuli based on contextual information. The assimilation effect, also known as assimilation bias, occurs when people judge something as closer to what’s around it, making it blend in with its context. In contrast, the contrast effect happens when people see something as farther apart from its surroundings, highlighting differences instead. These effects are widely studied in psychology and influence how we form opinions, make decisions, and view others. For example, if a student scores 85% on a test in a class where everyone else scores around 90%, the grade might seem worse due to contrast, but if the class average is 70%, the same 85% might feel more impressive because of assimilation.

== History and definition ==
Francis Bacon (1561 – 1626) is quoted to have written "The human understanding when it has once adopted an opinion ... draws all things else to support and agree with it."

In 1979, psychologists speculated about the mechanisms of biased assimilation in that one gives "any information that suggests less damaging ‘alternative interpretations’" such importance to use it as proof for one's belief. The classic Stanford University experiment involved supporters and opponents of the death penalty. After showing participants a study that concluded it deterred crime and another suggesting the opposite, they rated the study contradicting their beliefs as poor quality and not persuasive, so that the information resulted in more attitude polarization.

In 2004 it has been defined as a bias in evaluative judgments towards the position of a context stimulus. In an assimilation effect, judgment and contextual information are correlated positively, i.e. a positive context stimulus results in a positive judgment, whereas a negative context stimulus results in a negative judgment.

== Factors ==
Assimilation effects are more likely when the context stimulus and the target stimulus have characteristics that are quite close to each other. It is the power of narratives in fueling a certain belief. In priming experiments published in 1983, Herr, Sherman and Fazio found assimilation effects when subjects were primed with moderate context stimuli. Depending on how the individual categorizes information, contrast effects can occur as well. The more specific or extreme the context stimuli were in comparison to the target stimulus, the more likely contrast effects were to occur. For instance, if someone hears a weather forecast predicting a mildly warm 24°C day, they might perceive a 22°C day as pleasantly warm too (assimilation), but if the forecast was an extreme 35°C, the same 22°C might feel noticeably cooler by comparison (contrast).

The term assimilation effect appears in the field of social comparison theory as well. Complementary to the stated definition, it describes the effect of a felt psychological closeness of social surroundings that influence the current self-representation and self-knowledge.

== The inclusion/exclusion model ==
A more specific model to predict assimilation and contrast effects with differences in categorizing information is the inclusion/exclusion model developed 1992 by Norbert Schwarz and Herbert Bless. It explains the mechanism through which effects occur. The model assumes that in feature-based evaluative judgments of a target stimulus, people have to form two mental representations: One representation of the target stimulus and one representation of a standard of comparison to evaluate the target stimulus. Accessible information, i.e. information that comes to mind in that specific moment and draws attention, is the crucial context. The same accessible information can result in assimilation or contrast effects, depending on how it is categorized. When the accessible information to construct the representation of the target is used, an assimilation effect results, whereas accessible information used to construct the standard of comparison leads to contrast effects.

By way of illustration, in their research on the perceived trustworthiness of politicians, Schwarz & Bless either primed their subjects with info on scandal-ridden politicians (e.g. Richard Nixon) or did not prime them. When subsequently asked for the evaluation of politicians' trustworthiness in general, primed subjects evaluated politicians in general as less trustworthy than subjects without priming. This shows how access to the information of politicians' scandals was included in the representation of the target stimulus, i.e. an assimilation effect.

On the contrary, inclusion after priming did not occur, when subjects were subsequently asked for the trustworthiness of other specific politicians. There the priming led to a more favorable evaluation of the other politician's trustworthiness than without priming. This demonstrates a contrast effect, because the accessible information was excluded from the representation of the target stimulus (e.g. Richard Nixon is not Newt Gingrich) and therefore constructed in the mental representation of the standard of comparison.

== Simultaneous assimilation and successive contrast ==
Assimilation effects have been seen to behave quite differently when objects are presented simultaneously, rather than successively. A series of studies found assimilation effects when asking participants to rate the attractiveness of faces that were presented simultaneously. When an unattractive face was presented next to an attractive face, the unattractive face became more attractive, while the rating of the attractive face did not change. In other words, placing oneself next to an attractive person would make you more attractive, as long as you are less attractive than that person. These effects remained even if the number of faces presented increased and remained over two minutes after the context stimulus (the attractive face) was removed.

Relating these findings to the Inclusion/Exclusion Model above, in the Richard Nixon example, if Nixon is presented side by side Newt Gingrich, Nixon becomes more trustworthy, and the trustworthiness of Gingrich doesn't change then rather than when they are presented successively and Gingrich becomes more trustworthy. These studies also supported the Inclusion/Exclusion Model. Contrast effects appeared if attractive faces were presented before an unattractive face; in this case the unattractive face was rated as even more unattractive.

== Examples ==
Assimilation effects arise in fields of social cognition, for example in the field of judgment processes or in social comparison. Whenever researchers conduct attitude surveys and design questionnaires, they have to take judgment processes and resulting assimilation effects into account. Assimilation and contrast effects may arise through the sequence of questions. Previously asked specific questions can influence subsequent more general ones:

Many researchers found assimilation effects when deliberately manipulating the order of general and specific questions. When they first asked participants how happy they were with their dating or how satisfied they were with their relationship (a specific question that functions as a moderate context stimulus) and subsequently asked the participants how happy they were with their life in general (general question), they found assimilation effects. The specific question of their happiness with dating or satisfaction with their relationship made specific information accessible, that was further included as representation of the subsequent general question as target stimulus. Thus, by the time the participants were happy with their dating or satisfied with their relationship, they also reported being happier with their life in general. Similarly, when the participants were unhappy with their dating or dissatisfied with their relationships, they indicated being also unhappier with their life in general. This effect did not occur, when asking the general question in the first place.

To avoid assimilation effects in science communication Tim Caulfield has suggested to "preface any new finding with what the literature says, on balance, about the topic in question; readers might then understand that any marked aberration is less likely to be true."

== See also ==
- Anchoring
- Confirmation bias § Biased interpretation
- Distinction bias
- Norbert Schwarz § Categorization and Judgment

== Bibliography ==
- Colman, Andrew M. (2008). "Assimilation-contrast theory". A Dictionary of Psychology. Oxford University Press. ISBN 9780199534067.
- Oyserman, Daphna; Elmore, Kristen; Smith, George (2012). "Self, Self-Concept, and Identity" (PDF). In Leary, Mark R.; Tangney, June Price (eds.). Handbook of Self and Identity. Guilford Press. pp. 85–86. ISBN 9781462503056. Archived from the original (PDF) on 2016-02-27.
