= M. C. Escher in popular culture =

Popular cultural appearances for M.C. Escher artwork

There are numerous references to Dutch painter M. C. Escher in popular culture.

== References to Relativity ==
=== Film ===
In Dario Argento's 1977 film Suspiria, Escher's art is painted on several walls. As well, the main location of the film is on the fictitious "Escherstrasse", which is named after Escher.

Jim Henson's 1986 fantasy film Labyrinth features a room based on the painting Relativity.

The slasher film A Nightmare on Elm Street 5: The Dream Child (1989) features a pastiche of House of Stairs or Relativity conjured up by Freddy Krueger in his dream dimension, referred to in the script as the "Escher Maze". It is described as "an Escheresque, expressionistic landscape" and "an insane, logic-defying world where water runs uphill and stairs and doors stand at impossible angles to one another."

The idea of Shahram Mokri's 2013 film Fish & Cat was inspired by Escher's paintings. The director gives a change in the perspective of time in a single shot.

Christopher Nolan's 2010 film Inception contains a scene alluding to Escher's work in a dream setting.

In Night at the Museum: Secret of the Tomb (2014), Sir Lancelot, Teddy Roosevelt, and Larry Daley enter the painting Relativity, and experience the same strange gravity featured in it.

In the 2024 horror film Imaginary, the world of imagination – known as the Never-Ever – where the demon Chauncey lures the protagonists resembles Relativity.

=== Television ===
The Captain Future anime series features a variation of Escher's Relativity in its 40th episode, "Nightmare World: 4th Dimension" (悪夢の世界・四次元, Akumu no sekai shi-jigen), as the home dimension of alien energy creatures.

In "Clara's Dirty Little Secret", an episode of the first season of the Comedy Central animated series Drawn Together, Clara believes she is pregnant. At Toot's suggestion that she fall down some stairs, Clara thinks of a suitable room and leads them to the "M. C. Escher room", where Toot pushes Clara down, up, around, and back down a flight of stairs.

The FOX animated series Family Guy has alluded to Escher on three occasions. In "Brian Goes Back to College", Stewie and Brian share a room where Stewie puts up a framed print of Relativity, which he calls "Crazy Stairs". He then breaks it while playing Ultimate Frisbee and asks "Oh no, did that hit crazy stairs?" A later episode, "No Meals on Wheels", features Peter complaining that his new restaurant attracting paraplegics "is weirder than that rap video by M.C. Escher". Escher is then depicted inside Relativity dressed like MC Hammer in "U Can't Touch This" and rapping, "Going up the stairs and going down the stairs and going up the stairs and going down the stairs and going up the sideways stairs."

In another episode, after Stewie tells Brian he makes "less sense than M.C. Escher’s floor plan", the episode then shows the constructor complaining to the architect Escher that he cannot put six stairways "all in one spot", which is causing workers to quit.

In the Teen Titans first season episode "Mad Mod", its eponymous villain traps the Titans in an illusionary setting based on Escher's Relativity.

On the Syfy sci-fi series Warehouse 13, Escher is said by Leena to be one of the architects, along with Thomas Edison and Nikola Tesla, who designed the Warehouse. The Escher Vault's design resembles the lithograph Relativity. Inside the vault, the stairwells and walls are constantly moving, and anyone not wearing specially designed glasses risk being lost forever once inside. H. G. Wells is the only known individual to have successfully navigated the Escher Vault without glasses, instead using her Inperceptor Vest to retrieve personal items stored within.

In the Star vs. the Forces of Evil episode "Interdimensional Field Trip", Sabrina falls in a construction similar to Relativity.

The Rick and Morty episode "Morty's Mind Blowers" opens with the titular characters Rick and Morty fleeing from a humanoid creature in a place similar to Relativity.

The opening to The Addams Family animated series involves a visual based on Escher's Relativity.

The couch gag to the season 6, episode 21 episode of The Simpsons, titled "The PTA Disbands", features the living room, modeled after M. C. Escher's Relativity.

The Futurama episode "I, Roommate" features Relativity as one of the living spaces Fry and Bender are considering living in.

Escher is alluded to in the Phineas and Ferb episode "Gaming the System", in which Candace is found in an environment similar to Relativity.

The Final Space episode "Chapter Three" features a construct alluding to Escher.

The opening to the anime Go! Go! Loser Ranger! includes visuals heavily based on Escher's Relativity.

In Yu-Gi-Oh!, Yami Yugi's mind in the Millenium Puzzle is represented as a construction similar to Relativity, to emphasize the confusion he feels about his identity.

In the anime Ronin Warriors, the inside of Lord Arago's castle in the Netherworld resembles Escher's Relativity, but with a more Japanese design.

Hwang Dong-hyuk, director of Squid Game, said in an interview with Netflix that the set's maze-like corridors and stairs were inspired by M.C. Escher's Relativity.

In the Transformers: Cyberverse episode "The End of the Universe", Optimus Prime, Bumblebee, and Wheeljack are stranded in a dimension with infinite stairs connecting to each other defying the laws of gravity. The space is an allusion to the impossible object thematic of Escher.

=== Video games ===
In the city building game Afterlife, Hell's ultimate punishment for Envy is called the Escher pit, designed to torture souls by having them receive different punishments. After a few days, the prisoner is allowed to switch with a neighbor, only to find that all punishments are worse than the last. The outside slightly resembles Relativity.

In Final Fantasy IX, the third-disc dungeon Ipsen's Castle is modeled after the painting, featuring various inverted ladders and stairs.

In AdventureQuest Worlds, the first lord of chaos is Escherion, who has the ability to invert objects and lives in a castle with an inside similar to Relativity.

In the Psygnosis game Lemmings, the 18th level of "Taxing" is named "Tribute to M.C. Escher", as the solution involves building a zigzag stairway reminiscent of Relativity.

In God of War III, 'Hera's Garden' is an Escher inspired puzzle in which the player must manipulate various objects and the camera perspective to guide protagonist Kratos to the exit.

In the game Knock-Knock, one of the fragments of reality is a reference to Escher's work.

Over the decades, several video games have been released that are inspired by the art of M.C. Escher, such as Monument Valley. Some games borrow his graphical art style, some contain game mechanics that are heavily influenced by him, and others are tributes to his works.

In Dusk, the fifth map of the second episode is named "The Escher Labs". The level contains gravity-defying rooms, hallways, and stairs, akin to Relativity.

Wizard101 features a single player instance styled after Relativity known as the "Strange Room" in the Novus expansion.

=== Music ===
The cover of Mike Oldfield's Boxed (1976) mimics two of Escher's works: "Gallery" and "Other World".

Mick Jagger of The Rolling Stones twice unsuccessfully asked Escher to use his work for an LP cover. Jagger opened the first letter with “Dear Maurice,” but Escher politely replied that he had no time for that. He ended the letter with “By the way, please tell Mr. Jagger I am not Maurice to him but ”Very sincerely M.C. Escher."

The cover of British band Mott the Hoople's self-titled debut album features a colorized reproduction of Escher's lithograph Reptiles.

American rock band Chagall Guevara recorded the song "Escher's World" from their 1991 eponymous album.

In the video for "Around the World" (1997) by Daft Punk, men and women, dressed like mummies similar to those in Escher's painting, perpetually walk around on a stair.

"Escher", a song on Teenage Fanclub's album Thirteen, has lyrics that deal with disorientation.

The song "Mansion Party" by Ninja Sex Party features the line "Take an upside-down left at the M.C. Escher Stairs" and its animated music video shows a scene similar to that of Relativity.

In the song "White and Nerdy" by "Weird Al" Yankovic, he says "M.C. Escher, that's my favorite M.C."

American jazz saxophonist Michael Brecker has recorded a composition entitled "Escher Sketch (A Tale of Two Rhythms)". The album that features it, "Now You See It… (Now You Don't)", also has M.C.Escher's artwork on the cover.

Graham Waterhouse composed Perplexities after Escher for heckelphone, string quartet and double bass, based on five graphic artworks by Escher.

=== Other ===
Andrew Lipson created a Lego version of Relativity.

In 1981, Austria issued a postage stamp featuring Escher's Impossible Dice Construction and a 1998 Netherlands stamp illustrated a portrait of the artist alongside one of his works.

In the Black Swordsman arc of Berserk (1993), the first appearance of the astral plane is shown as a surreal labyrinth dimension that mixes surreal geometry with a dark atmosphere.

In 2007, a Relativity-inspired "Endless Staircase" room was added to Walt Disney World's Haunted Mansion attraction.

In 2017, four combs and 244 steps from old wooden-stepped escalators at Wynyard railway station, Sydney, Australia, were "refashioned into a soaring crisscrossing tangle reminiscent of an Escher puzzle" named 'Interloop', designed by local artist Chris Fox and hanging from a ceiling above one of the new sets of escalators.

== References to other works ==
The 1982 Doctor Who episode "Castrovalva" borrows its title from Escher's early lithograph of the same name. However, Escher's view of Castrovalva has none of the paradoxical elements of his later works to which the setting of the episode could more readily be compared.

Sheila Chandra included a piece called "Escher's Triangle" on her CD Roots and Wings – the title refers to Escher's use of the Penrose triangle in pictures like Waterfall.

A comic crossover between Mike Allred's Madman and Bernie Mireault's The Jam features Escher as a central character, as the two characters enter an alternate universe created by a somewhat godlike Escher, based on many of his works.

In 2006, Audi released a commercial with many Escher-inspired scenes.

The bonus stages of the first Sonic the Hedgehog game, for the Sega Genesis/Mega Drive, feature an animated background of birds turning into fish, a reference to Sky and Water I. Monument Valley and its sequels feature puzzles loosely based on Escher's works.

In The Legend of Zelda: Twilight Princess, the Oocca are modeled after the bird creatures seen in Another World, with the City in the Sky dungeon having some walking on walls like the birds in the painting.

The 1995 animated film The Thief and the Cobbler features a chase sequence taking place within set pieces loosely based on Escher's works. In Christopher Nolan's 2010 film Inception, Arthur demonstrates to Ariadne how to make unbreakable mental mazes by constructing infinite structures. He points out that, during their long conversation, they have been traversing the same single flight of stairs, and the camera pans out to show a staircase similar to Escher's Ascending and Descending.

In 2016, in The Hidden Oracle, the first book of the series The Trials of Apollo by Rick Riordan, Apollo notes that the paintings on the walls of the cave of the pythia Rachel resemble Escher's work.

== See also ==
- Video games inspired by M. C. Escher
