= Belvedere (M. C. Escher) =

Lithograph print by Dutch artist M. C. Escher

- Artist: M. C. Escher
- Year: 1958
- Type: Lithograph
- Dimensions: 46.2 cm × 29.5 cm (18.2 in × 11.6 in)

Belvedere is a lithograph print by the Dutch artist M. C. Escher, first printed in May 1958. It shows a plausible-looking belvedere building that is an impossible object, modelled after an impossible cube.

== Imagery ==
Escher uses two-dimensional images to depict objects freed of the confines of the three-dimensional world. A rectangular, three-story building dominates the scene. The upper two floors are open at the sides, with the top floor and roof supported by pillars. From the viewer's perspective, all the pillars on the middle floor appear the same size at the front and back, but the rear pillars are set higher. The viewer can also see that the corners of the top floor are at a different angle from the rest of the structure. These elements allow the pillars on the middle floor to stand at right angles while the front pillars seem to support the back side of the top floor and the rear pillars seem to support the front side. This paradox also allows a ladder to extend from the inside of the middle floor to the outside of the top floor.

A model of the cube that appears in the print

A man sits at the foot of the building holding an impossible cube. He appears to be constructing it from a diagram of a Necker cube at his feet, with the intersecting lines circled. The window next to him is closed with an iron grille that is geometrically valid but practically impossible to assemble.

== Influences ==
The woman about to climb the steps of the building is modeled after a figure from the right-hand panel of Hieronymus Bosch's 1500 triptych The Garden of Earthly Delights. This panel is individually titled Hell; a portion of it was recreated by Escher as a lithograph in 1935.

The title Belvedere refers to an architectural feature, from the Latin for "beautiful view": a gallery added atop a building, or a free-standing tower, sited for its outlook. Escher combined the two forms into a single structure and dressed his figures in the style of the late Middle Ages. According to Escher scholar Bruno Ernst, the impossible cuboid on which the building is based was Escher's own invention, in contrast to Ascending and Descending (1960) and Waterfall (1961), whose underlying figures he borrowed from Lionel and Roger Penrose.

The mountains in the background are based on drawings Escher made at Pettorano sul Gizio during a 1929 tour of Abruzzo, a region he returned to repeatedly while living in Italy.

== Legacy ==
In 2012, Prof. Gershon Elber of Israel's Technion University, using specially designed CAD software and a 3D printer, created a 3D model of Belvedere and other impossible Escher structures, viewable only from one angle.

== Sources ==
- Locher, J. L. (2000). The Magic of M. C. Escher. Harry N. Abrams, Inc. ISBN 978-0-8109-6720-5.
