= Recovery from blindness =

Phenomenon of a blind person gaining the ability to see

Recovery from blindness is the phenomenon of a blind person gaining the ability to see, usually as a result of medical treatment. As a thought experiment, the phenomenon is usually referred to as Molyneux's problem. It is often stated that the first published human case was reported in 1728 by the surgeon William Cheselden. However, there is no evidence that Cheselden's patient, Daniel Dolins, actually recovered any vision. Patients who experience dramatic recovery from blindness experience significant to total visual agnosia – serious confusion with their visual perception.

== As a thought experiment ==
The phenomenon has often been presented in empiricism as a thought experiment, in order to describe the knowledge gained from senses, and question the correlation between different senses.

John Locke, an 18th-century philosopher, speculated that if a blind person developed vision, he would not at first connect his idea of a shape with the sight of a shape. That is, if asked which was the cube and which was the sphere, he would not be able to do so, or even guess.

The question was originally posed to him by philosopher William Molyneux, whose wife was blind:

Suppose a man born blind, and now adult, and taught by his touch to distinguish between a cube and a sphere of the same metal, and nighly of the same bigness, so as to tell, when he felt one and the other, which is the cube, which is the sphere. Suppose then the cube and the sphere placed on a table, and the blind man made to see: query, Whether by his sight, before he touched them, he could now distinguish and tell which is the globe, which the cube? To which the acute and judicious proposer answers: 'Not. For though he has obtained the experience of how a globe, and how a cube, affects his touch; yet he has not yet attained the experience, that what affects his touch so or so, must affect his sight so or so...'

In 1709, in A New Theory of Vision, George Berkeley also concluded that there was no necessary connection between a tactile world and a sight world—that a connection between them could be established only on the basis of experience. He speculated:

the objects to which he had hitherto used to apply the terms up and down, high and low, were such as only affected or were in some way perceived by touch; but the proper objects of vision make a new set of ideas, perfectly distinct and different from the former, and which can in no sort make themselves perceived by touch (sect. 95).

This thought experiment (it was a thought experiment at the time) outlines the debate between rationalism and empiricism; to what degree our knowledge of the world comes from reason or experience.

== Early cases ==
There are many stories or anecdotes of the phenomenon, preceding the first documented case, including one from the year 1020, of a man of thirty operated upon in Arabia.

Before the first known human cases, some tests were done rearing animals in darkness, to deny them vision for months or years, then discover what they see when given light. A. H. Reisen found severe behavioural losses in such experiments; but they might have been due to degeneration of the retina.

The first known case of published recovery from blindness is often stated to be that described in a 1728 report of a blind 13-year-old boy operated by William Cheselden. Cheselden presented the celebrated case of the boy of thirteen who was supposed to have gained his sight after couching of congenital cataracts. In 2021, the name of Cheselden's patient was reported for the first time: Daniel Dolins. As it happens, philosopher George Berkeley knew the Dolins family, had numerous social links to Cheselden, including the poet Alexander Pope, and Princess Caroline, to whom Cheselden's patient was presented. The report misspelled Cheselden's name, used language typical of Berkeley, and may even have been ghost-written by Berkeley. Despite his youth, the boy encountered profound difficulties with the simplest visual perceptions. Described by "Chesselden":

When he first saw, he was so far from making any judgment of distances, that he thought all object whatever touched his eyes (as he expressed it) as what he felt did his skin, and thought no object so agreeable as those which were smooth and regular, though he could form no judgment of their shape, or guess what it was in any object that was pleasing to him: he knew not the shape of anything, nor any one thing from another, however different in shape or magnitude; but upon being told what things were, whose form he knew before from feeling, he would carefully observe, that he might know them again;

Unfortunately, Dolins was never able to see well enough to read, and there is no evidence that the surgery improved Dolins' vision at any point prior to his death at age 30. A total of 66 early cases of patients who underwent cataract operations were reviewed by Marius von Senden in his German 1932 book, which was later translated into English under the title Space and sight. In this book, von Senden argues that shapes, sizes, lengths and distances are difficult for blind people to judge, including for a time after their operation.

== Examples and case studies ==
=== Sidney Bradford ===
In 1963, Richard Gregory and Jean G. Wallace described a patient, Sidney Bradford, a 52-year-old who gained vision from corneal grafts to both eyes in 1959. No experimental psychologist was informed of the case until after the corneal grafting on one eye took place and the researchers were able to visit him only on day 48 after the first (preparatory) operation.

This case was able to reveal idiosyncrasies of the human visual system and perception in general. For example, not having grown up with vision, Bradford did not perceive the depth of the Necker cube nor the Schroeder stairs drawings and no ambiguity was observed:

We took the greatest possible care to ensure that he understood what we meant by "depth" and "reversal," after he asked us "What is depth?" We did this by showing him (after first obtaining negative answers to our question as to whether it reversed or was seen in depth), a child's wooden brick we had brought along, and pointed out that it receded from him by pointing out the depth with a finger, and getting him to touch it while looking at it. When he looked again at the picture cube he said that he could not see depth, and that, "it looks quite different [from the brick]." He tried, rather unsuccessfully, to draw a cube, but unfortunately this drawing is lost.

— Gregory & Wallace, Recovery from Early Blindness: A Case Study (1963)

There were used several other tests. Bradford wasn't able to interpret the perspective of two-dimensional art. He showed normal result while were presented with small model of Ames room and surprised the researchers by successfully and easily passing the Ishihara color vision test with only one correction:

We noted that he did not attempt to follow the figures with his finger, or make any related movements with his hands or fingers. He read the numbers out quite confidently and quickly, without apparent unusual mental effort. This seems to us the most interesting observation which we made in the study of S.B. This observation that he was able to read the characters even though masked in the coloured dots of the Ishihara test displays, seems to provide very strong evidence for transfer from earlier tactile experience. This is surprising in view of Riesen's findings that trans-modal transfer does not seem to occur in chimpanzees kept while young in the dark.

— Gregory & Wallace, Recovery from Early Blindness: A Case Study (1963)

Bradford was able to accurately judge the distance to objects in the same room, having been familiar with these distances before regaining sight by virtue of having walked them. In a similar analogy between vision and sightless (touch-only) experience, Bradford was able to visually read the time on the ward clock just after his operation. Before surgery Bradford was a cobbler and a machinist, but even after acquiring vision preferred working with his eyes closed to identify tools. He died two years after his operation due to a prolonged period of ill health, with no specific cause of death noted.

=== Michael May ===
Michael G. "Mike" May (born 1954) was blinded by a chemical explosion at the age of 3 but regained partial vision in 2000, at 46, after corneal transplantation and a pioneering stem cell procedure by San Francisco ophthalmologist Daniel Goodman. May had a stem-cell transplant in his right eye in 2001 when he was 47, after 40 years of blindness. He reportedly has adapted well to his recovered vision.

- May still has no intuitive grasp of depth perception. As people walk away from him, he perceives them as literally shrinking in size.
- He has problems distinguishing male from female faces, and recognizing emotional expressions on unfamiliar faces.

The effect of visual loss has an impact in the development of the visual cortex of the brain. The visual impairment causes the occipital lobe to lose its sensitivity in perceiving spatial processing. Sui and Morley (2008) proposed that after seven days of visual deprivation, a potential decrease in vision may occur. They also found an increasing visual impairment with deprivation after 30 days and 120 days. This study suggests that the function of the brain depends on visual input. May lost his eyesight at age three, when his vision was still not fully developed to distinguish shapes, drawings or images clearly. It would be difficult for him to be able to describe the world compared to a normal sighted person. For instance, May would have trouble differentiating complex shapes, dimension and orientations of objects. Hannan (2006) hypothesized that the temporal visual cortex uses prior memory and experiences to make sense of shapes, colours and forms. She proposed that the long-term effect of blindness in the visual cortex is the lack of recognition of spatial cues.

At three years of age, May's vision had still not reached the acuity of an adult person, so his brain was still not completely exposed to all possible clarity of images and light of the environment. This made it difficult for Michael to lead a normal daily life. Cohen et al. (1997) suggested that early blindness causes a poor development of the visual cortex with the result of a decrease in somatosensory development. This study proposed that Michael's long-term blindness affects his ability to distinguish in between faces of males and females, and to recognize pictures and images. In spite of the surgery on his right eye, his newly regained vision, after blindness of forty years, is not fully recovered. Thinus-Blanc and Gaunet (1997) suggest that early blinded people show limited ability in spatial representation. Michael still struggles to identify pictures or illustrations. The impairment of his visual cortex, due to the loss of his vision at a very early age, resulted in visual cortex cells that are not used to the stimuli in his surroundings. Cohen et al. (1997) proposed that in their early age, blinded subjects developed strong motivations to tactile discrimination tasks. May's early blindness benefited him so far; he developed very precise senses of hearing and touch.

In 2006, journalist Robert Kurson wrote a book on May, Crashing Through, expanded from an article he did for Esquire, which was adapted into a motion picture. Crashing Through was released on May 15, 2007.

=== Shirl Jennings ===
Shirl Jennings (1940–2003) was blinded by illness as a young boy. Experimental surgery in 1991 partially restored his vision, but, like Bradford and May, Jennings found the transition to sightedness difficult. According to Dr. Oliver Sacks in his book, An Anthropologist on Mars, Jennings' subsequent behavior was that of a "mentally blind" person—someone who sees but cannot decipher what is out there; he would act as if he were still blind. Often confused, he rapidly sank into depression. In 1992, a pneumonia infection resulted in anoxia, and ultimately cost Jennings his vision again.

=== Shander Herian ===
In 2011, The Guardian published a story about Shander Herian, who was blinded by illness at the age of 14 and fully recovered after an experimental surgery in middle age.

== Modern history ==
More recently, another condition called aniridia has been treated with reconstructive surgery using the membrane from the amniotic sac that surrounds a fetus combined with stem cell transplantation into the eye. In 2003, three people were successfully implanted with a permanent "retinal prosthesis" by researchers at the University of Southern California. Each patient wore spectacles with miniature video cameras that transmitted signals to a 4-mm-by-5-mm retinal implant via a wireless receiver embedded behind the ear.

== See also ==
- Amblyopia, or lazy eye, a decrease in vision due to impaired sensory development
- Blindsight – when a blind person can perceive visual stimuli unconsciously
- Hand-eye coordination
- Stereopsis recovery – recovery of stereo vision
