= Tribar =

Tribar may refer to:

- The Penrose Tribar, triangular figure
- Triathlon handlebars for bicycles
- Triple bar (≡), symbol used in mathematics and logic
