= Devil's Pitchfork =

Devil's Pitchfork can refer to:

- The blivet, also known as the Devil's tuning fork, an impossible object and optical illusion
- Plants in the genus Bidens, particularly Bidens pilosa and Bidens frondosa
- Twin-lead radio frequency electrical cables
