= Cube with Magic Ribbons =

Lithograph print by M. C. Escher, first printed in 1957

- Artist: M. C. Escher
- Year: 1957
- Type: Lithograph
- Dimensions: 31 cm × 31 cm (12 in × 12 in)

Cube with Magic Ribbons is a lithograph print by the Dutch artist M. C. Escher first printed in 1957. It depicts two interlocking bands wrapped around the frame of a Necker cube. The bands have what Escher called small "nodules" or "buttonlike protuberances" that make use of the dome/crater illusion, an optical illusion characterized by shifting perception of depth from concave to convex depending on direction of light and shadow. Escher's interest in reversible perspectives, as seen in Cube with Magic Ribbons, can also be noted in an earlier work, Convex and Concave, first printed in 1955.

Although the cube framework in Cube with Magic Ribbons by itself is perfectly possible, the interlocking of the "magical" bands within it is impossible. Escher scholar Bruno Ernst argues that this print is significant for being the first of four Escher drawings to use impossible object. However, there is debate as to whether the figure constitutes a true visual impossibility or is merely ambiguous, as the bands do not have continuous contours that unite their front and back faces, meaning they lose their visible boundaries when they cross over each other.
