= Shepard elephant =

Perceptual illusion

Poster showing Shepard elephant (4 legs, 4 feet)

The Shepard elephant, also known as l'egs-istential quandary or the impossible elephant, is a perceptual illusion, of the type impossible object, based on figure-ground confusion. As its creator Roger Shepard explains:

The elephant…belongs to a class of objects that are truly impossible in that the object itself cannot be globally segregated from the nonobject or background. Parts of the object (in this case the elephant’s legs) become the background, and vice versa.

== History ==
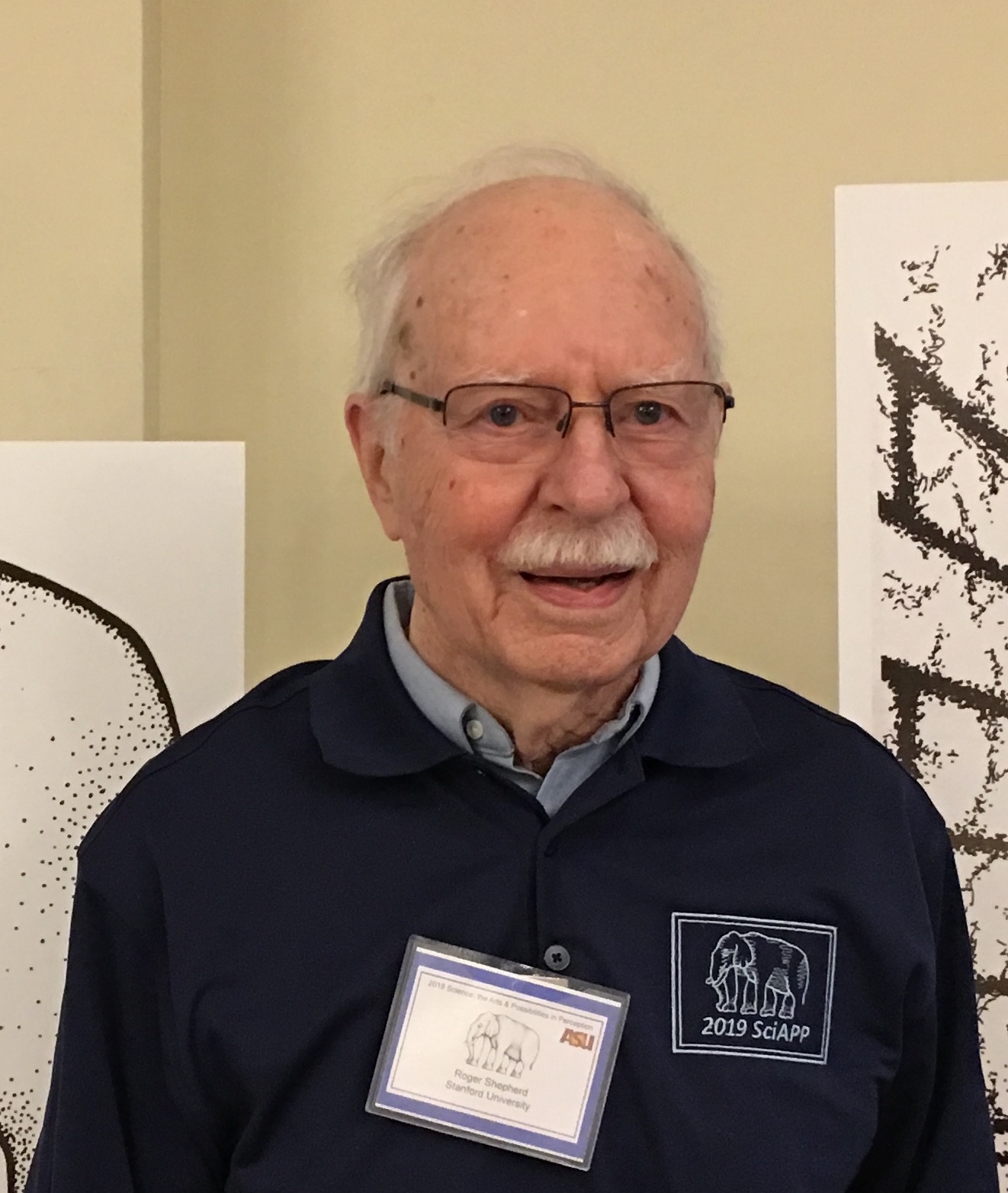
Stanford psychologist Roger Shepard (March 2019), who first published this paradox in 1990

Shepard first published this optical paradox in his 1990 book Mind Sights (page 79) giving it the name "l'egs-istential quandary". It is the first entry in his chapter on "Figure-ground impossibilities". The pen-and-ink drawing is based on a dream Shepard had in 1974, and on the pencil sketch he made when he woke up.

== Interpretation ==
Blivet illusion, another impossible figure based on figure-ground confusion

The image is widely reproduced and discussed. Brad Honeycutt, author of Exceptional Eye Tricks, calls the Shepard elephant "one of the most famous and classic optical illusions."

The MIT Encyclopedia of the Cognitive Sciences classifies it under "Illusions of Interpretation" as an example of "Impossible Pictures", saying, "Impossible figures embody conflicting 3D clues...Shepard's elephant (figure 2) confuses its legs with the spaces in between. Local votes about depth are not properly integrated."

The Oxford Companion to Consciousness suggests as a way to understand "Shepard’s many-legged elephant": "try slowly uncovering the elephant from the top, or from the bottom." (If you cover the bottom of the drawing, you see the top of an elephant with four legs. If you cover the drawing's top, you see four elephant feet, plus trunk and tail.)

Al Seckel, who devotes Chapter 18 of his book Masters of Deception to Roger Shepard, draws a contrast between Shepard's elephant and the impossible trident (aka the "blivet" or "Devil's tuning fork"). Although an impossible trident has a closed edge, Seckel says the "conspicuous line discontinuity" of the elephant's tail is necessary to avoid a "counting paradox": a blivet is an imaginary object, but everyone knows an elephant has exactly four legs and exactly four feet.

== Influence ==
The Shepard elephant has attracted interest outside scholarly sources. Author Clive Gifford included it in his 2013 book for children Eye Benders, and told The Guardian it is one of his favorites.

Sometime before 2012, someone created a modified version of the Shepard elephant. The modified elephant has an extra hind leg, with foot attached, made by extending the curved line that Shepard left ambiguous (to look like either the top of a leg or the end of a tail.) This modified image, which now has four legs but five feet, was circulated as "How many legs does this elephant have?"

The Shepard elephant has also inspired some other derivative works. The OpticalSpy website also cited the Shepard elephant as inspiration for manipulating a photograph of an Indian elephant to give it six legs.

== See also ==
- M. C. Escher
- Pareidolia
