= William Preston Phelps =

American painter

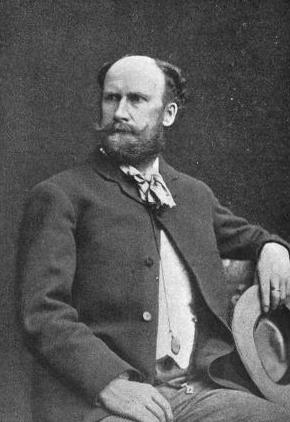
William Preston Phelps, ca. 1897

William Preston Phelps (1848–1923), known as "the Painter of the Monadnock", was an American landscape painter.

== Early years ==
He was born on the family farm near Chesham, then the Pottersville section of Dublin, New Hampshire, on March 6, 1848 to mother Mary Phelps and father Jayson Phelps. "Preston", as he was known, grew up helping out on the very active family farm, where his father in his spare time, liked to paint, build furniture and musical instruments. Preston drew constantly, when he wasn't tending the animals or mowing the fields. His father recognized the financial benefits of talents, as he too painted houses as extra income, and sent William on to the thriving mill city of Lowell, Massachusetts to work for the sign painter Jeduthan Kittredge at the age of 14.

While engaged as a sign painter in Lowell, Phelps created paintings on canvas on the side. All the while, he fell in love with the boss's daughter, Anna Marie. At the age of 20, in 1868 he married Anna, and a year later he opened his own sign painting company on the same street as his father-in-law's business. On August 21, 1871 in Lowell, the young couple had a daughter named Ina Kittredge Phelps. A son, Edward, was born three years later. Phelps' talents began to shift away from signage, as people were so impressed by the intricacies and beauty of his work, patrons started to hire him for canvas paintings. To focus his talent, he began to take the train into Boston for evening art classes, then he would paint landscape scenes that he sold out of the window of his shop. After a few years, at the age of 27, he had his first exhibition of his works, in Lowell, where a group of patrons were so impressed, they funded Phelps to study abroad in Munich.

== Travelling years ==
Leaving his wife Anna and their two children behind, the 28-year-old set sail in 1875 for the Royal Academy of Art in Munich to study painting for two years before heading back to the States.

He returned home only to settle his estate, then set sail, this time with his entire family, which would be some of the happiest days of his life. Now, with his family around him, he studied the art of "plein air" painting under Munich's Veltron. Here he travelled up and down the Rhine and Düssel rivers, setting up elaborate tents to paint outside, all the while sending paintings back to the States for exhibition at the National Academy of Design where they sold two paintings for him. He lived in Munich for another three years, where he studied with other Lowellians, including James McNeill Whistler and David Dalhoff Neal, and was also co-founder of the Munich Art Club with other members such as Walter Shirlaw, David Dalhoff Neal, Frank Duveneck, and William Merritt Chase. During this time a second daughter, Alice Laura Phelps, was born on July 11, 1879. Next he headed for Paris where he stayed for two more years.

From their new residence in Paris, they travelled to England, Scotland, and Wales. After five years of traveling through Europe, the family headed for home, sailing from Glasgow to New York, then by coach to Lowell, where they received a hero's welcome.

After settling his family, Phelps once again headed for Europe in 1881 for a whirlwind trip, this time to the Scottish Highlands, then with his friend William Merritt Chase on a working tour of Italy, Venice, and Capri, then back to Germany before returning to Lowell via New York. After a devastating sail back across the Atlantic, that took the lives of three crewmen and broke the main mast in a hurricane, William again set up his studio shop in Lowell.

Now back on dry land, and with his shop in Lowell, William began travel up and down the New England coast, painting landscapes in the summers, while also painting portraits of prize cattle and bulls in the off season for the next five years. Then, in 1886, he headed west. Here he painted the Grand Canyon on a huge 7' x 12' canvas which required him to erect a shelter around him as he painted outside or "plein aire".

With the death of his father in 1888, William and Anna moved the family to the old family farm at the foot of Mount Monadnock in New Hampshire, just after Anna finished out high school in the summer of 1890.

== Later years ==
After spending a majority of his 30s traveling and painting around Europe and the U.S., Phelps finally settled down in 1890 when he re-acquired his old family farm near Chesham, New Hampshire. He remained in the area painting many exterior New England landscapes. Here is when he perfected the "plain air" style. Even in winter, Phelps continued to paint outdoors by building an elaborate shelter studio, that could be transported by a horse-drawn sled, and had its own oil burning stove for heat.

His daughter Ina Kittredge Phelps became an artist in her own right, who married Robert Peter Hayward on March 21, 1893. Ina and Robert settled down the road in Keene, where they raised their five children, including the famous inventor, architect, and artist Roger Hayward.

In 1901, tragedy struck, when his son Edward, now 27, an artist and lecturer himself, was traveling in Waco, Texas, and rescued a child from the tracks of an oncoming train. He saved the child, but was struck dead by the train. Phelps' wife Anna died just six months later. Phelps began to drink heavily, and in 1906 he remarried but divorced in 1909. By his late 60s, William started to fade with the sadness of his wife Anna and son Edward dying, and his finances weakened. In 1914, he began to borrow money from a Lowell financing firm, and quickly got into debt. After Phelps pulled a gun on his friend and neighbor in the winter of 1917, the authorities were notified. The police came and escorted the aging artist away, and was labeled an "invalid" by the asylum in Concord, New Hampshire. On August 2, 1917 all his possessions were auctioned off, all around the same time his grandson Roger was graduating from Keene High School and heading off to MIT. On January 6, 1923, at the age of 75, William died in the same community he was born. He was laid to rest in Edson Cemetery in Lowell, Massachusetts.

Today, many of Phelps' papers, work orders, and art are archived at the Smithsonian.

== Notable works ==
- "Haying"
- "Tillers of the soil"
- "Reflections"
- "Wooded landscape with waterfall"
- "Grand Canyon", 1886
- "Afternoon Walk" ca.1890
- "Mount Monadnock from Stone Pond" (ca.1900) displayed at the Currier Museum of Art.
- "Cows Crossing the Brook"
- "Landscape with Sheep"
- "Logging in the Deep Woods"
- "Cattle at the Water Trough, Winter"
- "Late Afternoon, A Winter Day"
- "Autumn River Scene"
- "Mischief In The Barn"
- "Rabbit Hunters"
