= Ascending and Descending =

1960 lithograph by M. C. Escher

- Artist: M. C. Escher
- Year: 1960
- Type: lithograph
- Dimensions: 35.5 cm × 28.5 cm (14 in × 11 1/4 in)

Ascending and Descending is a lithograph print by the Dutch artist M. C. Escher first printed in March 1960. The original print measures 14 in × 11 1/4 in (35.6 cm × 28.6 cm). The lithograph depicts a large building roofed by a never-ending staircase. Two lines of identically dressed men appear on the staircase, one line ascending while the other descends.

== Description ==
The lithograph shows two lines of identically dressed men on the staircase, one line ascending while the other descends. Two figures sit apart from the people on the endless staircase: one in a secluded courtyard, the other on a lower set of stairs. While most two-dimensional artists use relative proportions to create an illusion of depth, Escher here and elsewhere uses conflicting proportions to create the visual paradox.

The two concentric processions on the stairs use enough people to emphasise the lack of vertical rise and fall. In addition, the shortness of the tunics worn by the people makes it clear that some are stepping up and some are stepping down.

== Background and influences ==
Ascending and Descending was influenced by, and is an artistic implementation of, the Penrose stairs, an impossible object; Lionel Penrose had first published his concept in the February 1958 issue of the British Journal of Psychology. Escher developed the theme further in his print Waterfall, which appeared in 1961.

Two earlier Escher pictures that feature stairs are House of Stairs and Relativity.

The work is referenced in The Simpsons' 1991 episode "Brush with Greatness".

=== Architectural influences ===
In a 1969 letter, Escher attributed the architecture of his prints to the southern Italian buildings he had seen in Amalfi Coast towns, including Atrani, which he had depicted in his work of the early 1930s.

Escher documented the Mediterranean architectural influences, stating: "When it comes to architecture, in my prints I have been strongly influenced by southern Italian buildings, where Norman, Romanesque, Saracen and Moorish influences can often be distinguished." He described a preference for "bread roll domes, flat, whitewashed roofs, and plastered walls" and stated that "almost all these elements I saw on the Amalfi coast."

== Interpretation ==
The structure is embedded in human activity. By showing an unaccountable ritual of what Escher calls an 'unknown' sect, Escher has added an air of mystery to the people who ascend and descend the stairs. Therefore, the stairs themselves tend to become incorporated into that mysterious appearance.

There are 'free' people and Escher said of these: 'recalcitrant individuals refuse, for the time being, to take part in the exercise of treading the stairs. They have no use for it at all, but no doubt, sooner or later they will be brought to see the error of their non-conformity.'

Escher suggests that not only the labours, but the very lives of these monk-like people are carried out in an inescapable, coercive and bizarre environment. Another possible source for the look of the people is the Dutch idiom monnikenwerk ("a monk's job"), which refers to a long and repetitive working activity with absolutely no practical purposes or results, and, by extension, to something completely useless.
