= Universal law of generalization =

Theory of cognition

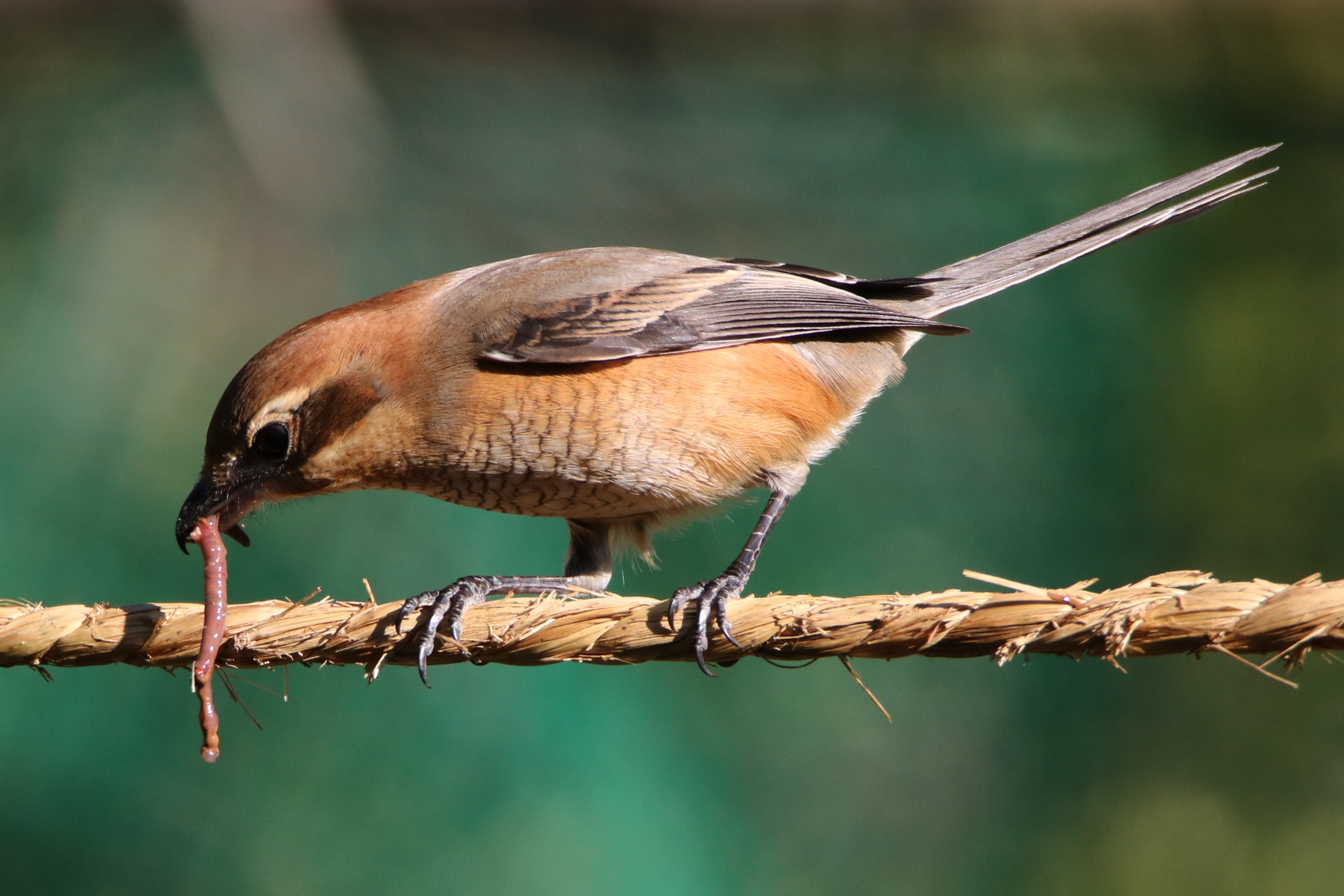
Bird with earthworm: Shepard gives example of bird using "generalization," based on experience with one previous worm, to decide if another worm is edible.

The universal law of generalization is a theory of cognition stating that the probability of a response to one stimulus being generalized to another is a function of the “distance” between the two stimuli in a psychological space. It was introduced in 1987 by Roger Shepard, who began researching mechanisms of generalization while he was still a graduate student at Yale:

"I was now convinced that the problem of generalization was the most fundamental problem confronting learning theory. Because we never encounter exactly the same total situation twice, no theory of learning can be complete without a law governing how what is learned in one situation generalizes to another".

Shepard’s 1987 paper gives a "generalization" example of a bird that has eaten one earthworm, and is presented with a slightly different-looking earthworm. Explaining the concept of "psychological space" in the abstract of his 1987 paper, Shepard wrote:

"A psychological space is established for any set of stimuli by determining metric distances between the stimuli such that the probability that a response learned to any stimulus will generalize to any other is an invariant [monotonic function] of the distance between them".

Using experimental evidence from both human and non-human subjects, Shepard hypothesized, more specifically, that the probability of generalization will fall off exponentially with the distance measured by one of two particular metrics. His analysis goes on to argue for the universality of this rule for all sentient organisms, due to evolutionary internalization.

== Additional research and commentary ==
In 1988, Daniel M. Ennis of the Philip Morris Research Center wrote that Shepard’s theory might be irrelevant because research by Nosofsky had found “several exceptions” to it. Shepard responded by asserting that Nosofsky’s experiments focused on “ the precise locations of individual stimuli in ‘psychological space’” whereas his experiments focused on the “location, size, and shape of the region of psychological space corresponding to the set of stimuli having the same important consequence as a given training stimulus”.

Other researchers have followed Shepard’s research. In 2000, Ken Cheng from Macquarie University experimented on the special generalization of honeybees, comparing his findings with earlier research on humans and pigeons. Cheng explained his understanding of Shepard’s law of generalization in this study as such:

“Suppose that an animal finds food in a container at one location (S+). When the animal returns, the container is at a noticeably different location. Will the animal still ‘bet’ on finding food in the container? Underlying this question is the assumption that the animal can discriminate the two locations. Shepard’s law does not apply when the animal has trouble discriminating between stimuli. The question is whether the two locations have the same consequence of concern—in this case, whether the container contains food…”

Cheng measured the bee’s response to copies of a container in different locations, the original staying in one area and holding sugar water. The copy containers would then either have plain tap water or sugar water. Measurements of generalization gradients were separated by both distance and direction according to Shepard’s law. Cheng found that “generalization gradients in both series were fitted by exponential functions, supporting Shepard’s law”. Cheng’s research suggested that Shepard’s law had the potential to be generalized to more than only mammals and birds but to invertebrates as well. In 2001, Chater and Vitányi attempted to provide a “mathematically more appealing form of the Universal Law”. They explain the necessity of a different mathematical outlook than the one presented in Shepard’s paper by illustrating the example of a photograph and its negative:

“Thus, while the positive and negative of the same picture are far away from each other in terms of Euclidean distance, they are at almost zero distance in terms of universal distance because interchanging the black and white pixels transforms one picture into the other”

Chater and Vitányi admit that their way of approaching the law of generalization might be too abstract to fit a psychological equation, but argue that a simple abstract explanation would be as suitable as any other elementary explanation in a practical sense when faced with situations that are webbed with complex mathematical explanations.

Chris R. Sims has attempted to offer another look at the law of generalization through the scope of the principle of efficient coding. Sims makes the case for rate-distortion theory through perceptual identification experiments.

Steven A. Frank of the University of California, Irvine proposed another outlook on the approach of the law of generalization. He argues that the exponential form of the universal law arises simply because it is the only mathematical transformation from a continuous perceptual scale to a response probability which is invariant to shift and stretch.
