= Louis Albert Necker =

Swiss crystallographer (1786–1861)

Louis Albert Necker de Saussure FRSE MWS FGS (10 April 1786 – 20 November 1861) was a Swiss crystallographer and geographer.

Necker cube on the left, impossible cube on the right.

He is best remembered for devising the optical illusion now known as the Necker cube.

== Life ==
He was born in the Republic of Geneva, the son of botanist Professor Jacques Necker, nephew and namesake of statesman Jacques Necker, and Albertine Necker de Saussure.

He was educated in Geneva, then sent to Edinburgh University in Scotland to study Sciences from 1806 to 1808.

The Necker cube is an optical illusion that was first published as a rhomboid in 1832 by him.

He returned to Scotland in 1841 and settled on the Isle of Skye, lodging with the Cameron family at Bosville Terrace in Portree. His scientific interests turned to astronomy and a study of the aurora borealis. In 1843 and 1845, he was joined by his friend, James Forbes, a physicist and glaciologist. Together, they made the first accurate map of the Cuillins.

He spent his later life mountaineering and collecting ornithological specimens. He died in Portree on 20 November 1861. He is buried next to the Cameron family in the Portree churchyard.

== Works ==
- Mémoire sur les oiseaux des environs de Genève, Genève : Chez J.J. Paschoud, 1823. OCLC 12072634
- Voyage en Écosse et aux Iles Hébrides. Genève, Paris, J.J. Paschoud, 1821. OCLC 3759700
- Memoire sur la vallée de Valorsine, Genève : J. Barbezat et comp., 1828. OCLC 30521860
- Mémoire sur le Mont Somma. Genève. : Barbezat et Delarue. 1828. OCLC 68706185
- Le règne minéral ramené aux méthodes de l'histoire naturelle, Paris : Levrault, 1835. OCLC 8739030
- Études géologiques dans les Alpes, Paris : Pitois : Langlois et Leclercq; Strasbourg : Levrault, 1841. OCLC 77840885
