= Roger Hayward =

American engineer (1899–1979)

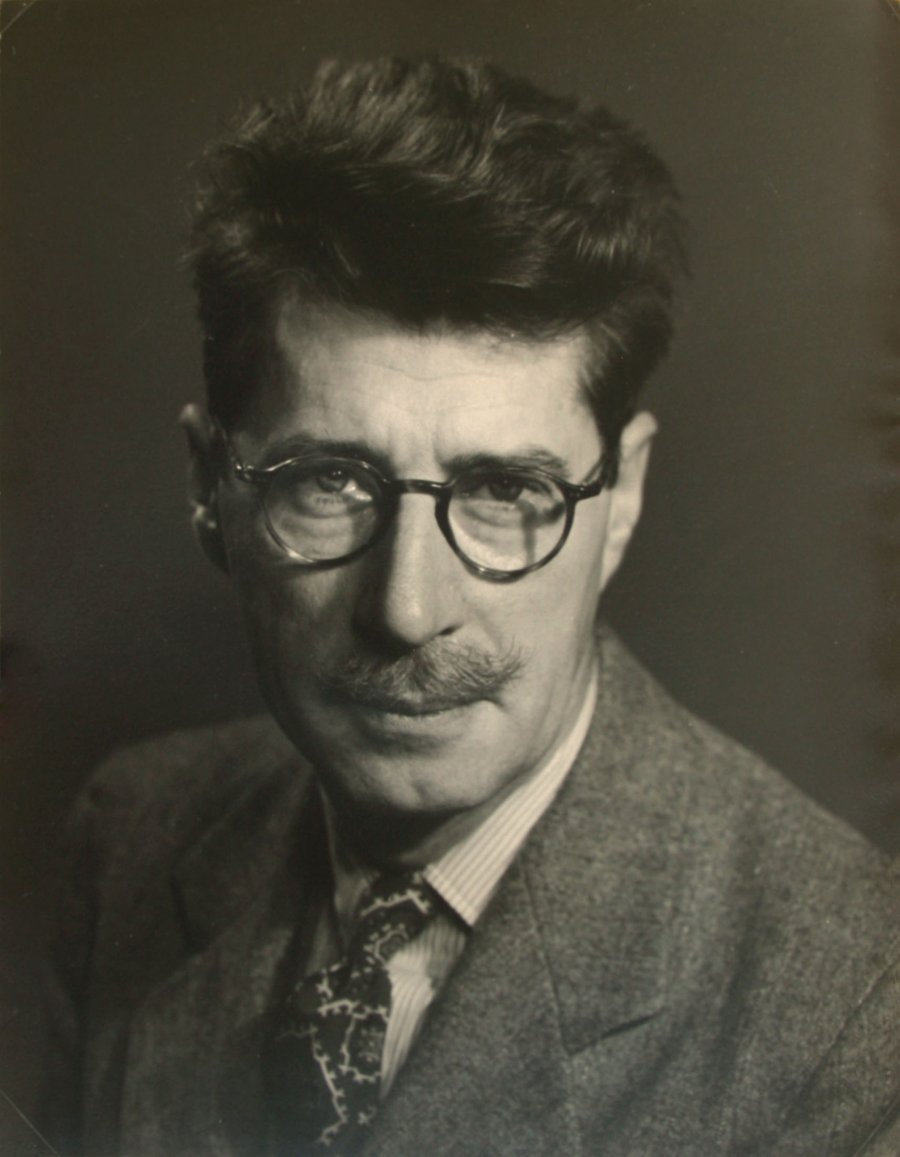
- Born: October 11, 1899
- Died: October 11, 1979 (aged 80)
- Occupation: Artist
- Notable work: Blivet

Roger Hayward (1899 – October 11, 1979) was an American artist, architect, optical designer and astronomer. He is the inventor of an early Schmidt-Cassegrain camera that was patented in 1945. He was born on January 7, 1899, to mother, artist Ina Kittredge (Phelps) Hayward and local businessman and time piece hobbyist Robert Peter Hayward. He was the grandson of American landscape artist William Preston Phelps.

In December 1968 he wrote "Blivets: Research and Development" to The Worm Runner's Digest in which he presented interpretations of impossible objects.
