= Penrose triangle =

Impossible object

Penrose triangle

The Penrose triangle, also known as the Penrose tribar, the impossible tribar, or the impossible triangle, is a triangular impossible object, an optical illusion consisting of an object that can be depicted in a perspective drawing. It cannot exist as a solid object in ordinary three-dimensional Euclidean space, although its surface can be embedded isometrically (bent but not stretched) in five-dimensional Euclidean space. It was first created by the Swedish artist Oscar Reutersvärd in 1934. Independently from Reutersvärd, the triangle was devised and popularized in the 1950s by psychiatrist Lionel Penrose and his son, the mathematician and Nobel Prize laureate Roger Penrose, who described it as "impossibility in its purest form". It is featured in the lithograph Waterfall (1961) by artist M. C. Escher, whose earlier depictions of impossible objects partly inspired it.

== Description ==
A rotating Penrose triangle model to show illusion. At the moment of illusion, there appears to be a pair of purple faces (one partially occluded) joined at right angles, but these are actually parallel faces, and the partially occluded face is internal, not external.

The tribar/triangle appears to be a solid object, made of three straight beams of square cross-section that meet pairwise at right angles at the vertices of the triangle they form. The beams may be broken, forming cubes or cuboids.

This combination of properties cannot be realized by any three-dimensional object in ordinary Euclidean space. Such an object can exist in certain Euclidean 3-manifolds. A surface with the same geodesic distances as the depicted surface of the tribar, but without its flat shape and right angles, are to be preserved, can also exist in 5-dimensional Euclidean space, which is the lowest-dimensional Euclidean space within which this surface can be isometrically embedded. There also exist three-dimensional solid shapes each of which, when viewed from a certain angle, appears the same as the 2-dimensional depiction of the Penrose triangle, such as the sculpture "Impossible Triangle" in East Perth, Western Australia The term "Penrose Triangle" can refer to the 2-dimensional depiction or the impossible object.

If a line is traced around the Penrose triangle, a 4-loop Möbius strip is formed.

== Creation of the Penrose triangle from partial figures ==
Creation of the Penrose triangle (right) from two real perceptible partial figures

If the left part of the figure is moved parallel to the right until its upper horizontal edge coincides with the upper horizontal edge of the middle part of the figure, the Penrose triangle (right) is created by overlapping the two parts.

The first two partial views of the Penrose triangle are individually perceptible, whereas the resulting tribar represents an impossible figure.

== Depictions ==
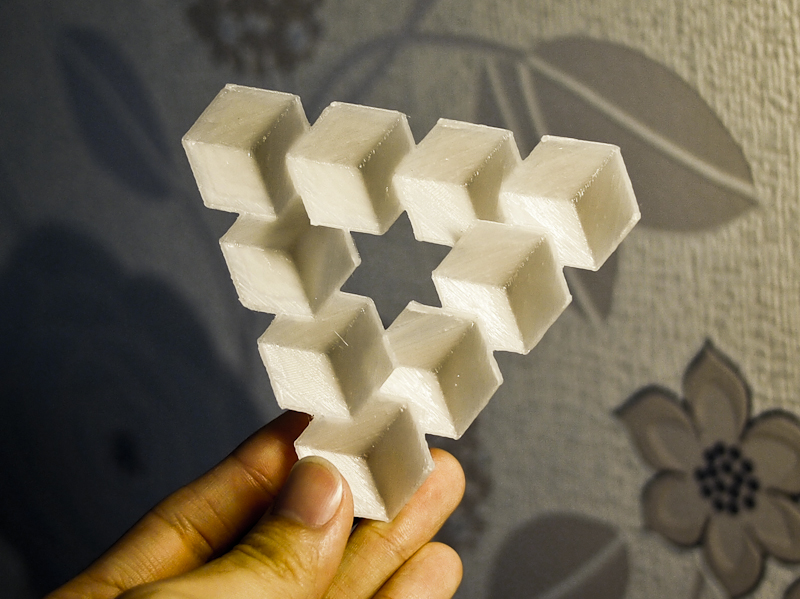
A 3D-printed version of the Reutersvärd Triangle illusion

M. C. Escher's lithograph Waterfall (1961) depicts a watercourse that flows in a zigzag along the long sides of two elongated Penrose triangles, so that it ends up two stories higher than it began. The resulting waterfall, forming the short sides of both triangles, drives a water wheel. Escher points out that in order to keep the wheel turning, some water must occasionally be added to compensate for evaporation. A third Penrose triangle lies between the other two, formed by two segments of waterway and a support tower.

=== Sculptures ===
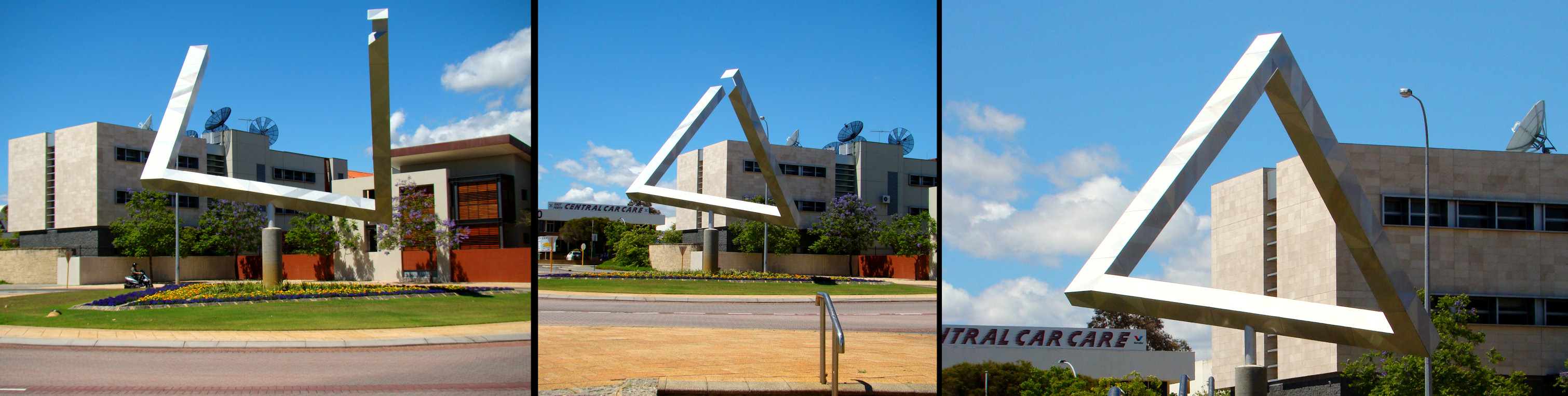
"Impossible Triangle", Brian McKay and Ahmad Abas, East Perth, Australia, 1999

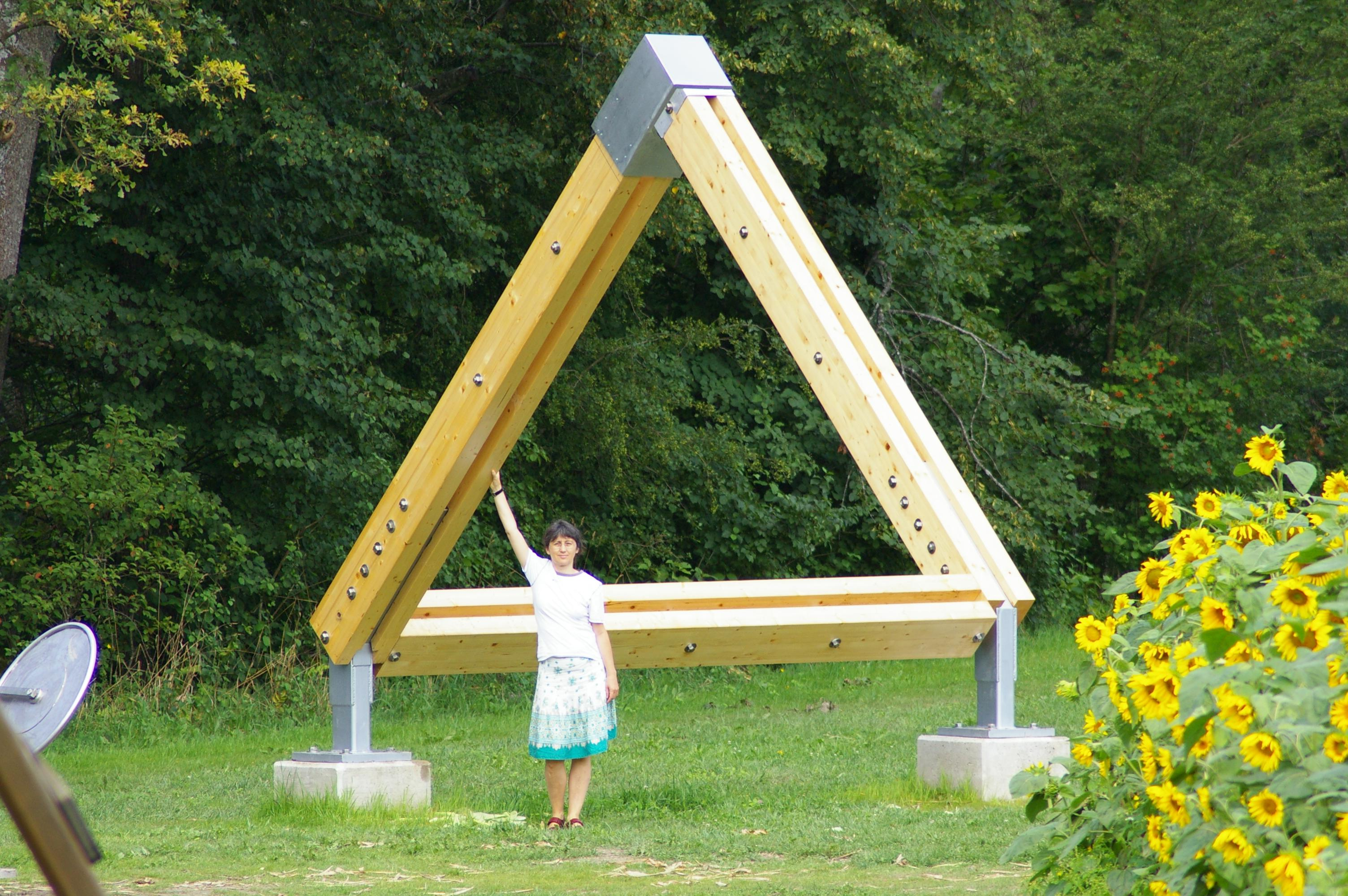
Impossible Triangle sculpture, Gotschuchen, Austria

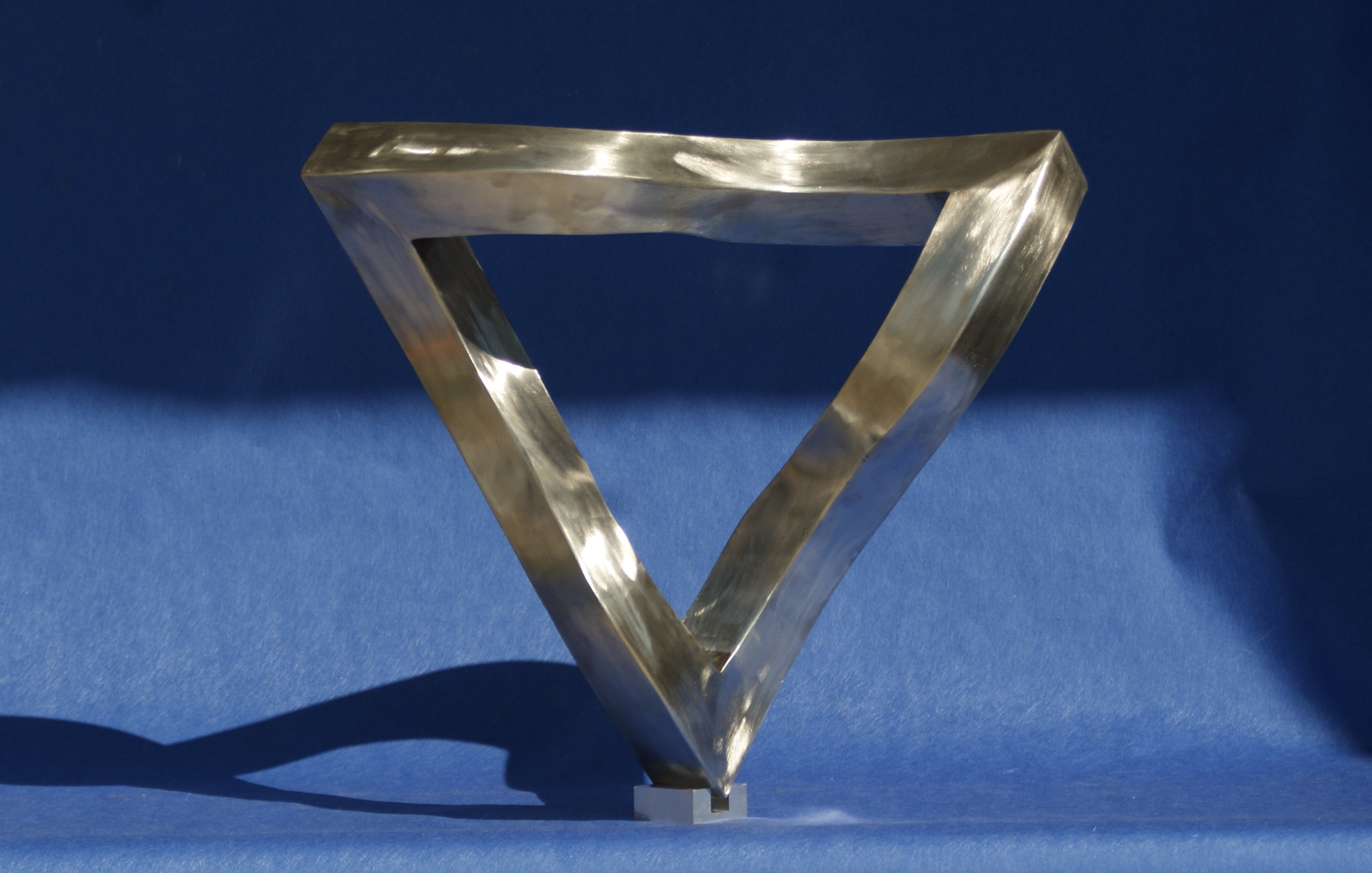
Real Penrose Triangle, Stainless Steel, by W.A.Stanggaßinger, Wasserburg am Inn, Germany. This type of impossible triangle was first created in 1969 by the Soviet kinetic artist Vyacheslav Koleichuk.

== See also ==
- Impossible cube
- Impossible trident
- Shepard elephant
- Penrose stairs
