= Necker cube =

Form of perceptual phenomena

The Necker cube: a wire frame cube with no depth cues

One possible interpretation of the Necker cube

Another possible interpretation

The Necker cube is an optical illusion that was first published as a rhomboid in 1832 by Swiss crystallographer Louis Albert Necker. It is a simple, wire-frame, two-dimensional drawing of a translucent cube with no visual cues as to its orientation, so it can be interpreted to have either the lower-left or the upper-right square as its front side.

== Ambiguity ==
The Necker cube is an ambiguous drawing.

Each part of the picture is ambiguous by itself, yet the human visual system picks an interpretation of each part that makes the whole consistent. The Necker cube is sometimes used to test computer models of the human visual system to see whether they can arrive at consistent interpretations of the image the same way humans do.

Necker cube (left) and impossible cube (right)

Humans do not usually see an inconsistent interpretation of the cube. A cube whose edges cross in an inconsistent way is an example of an impossible object, specifically an impossible cube.

With the cube on the left, most people see the lower-left face as being in front most of the time. This is possibly because people view objects from above, with the top side visible, far more often than from below, with the bottom visible, so the brain "prefers" the interpretation that the cube is viewed from above.

There is evidence that by focusing on different parts of the figure, one can force a more stable perception of the cube. The intersection of the two faces that are parallel to the observer forms a rectangle, and the lines that converge on the square form a "y-junction" at the two diagonally opposite sides. If an observer focuses on the upper "y-junction" the lower left face will appear to be in front. The upper right face will appear to be in front if the eyes focus on the lower junction. Blinking while being on the second perception will probably cause you to switch to the first one.

Adding an intermediate blue bar object going "down from the top" (left) or "up from the bottom" (right) shows how the image can change its perspective simply by changing which face (front or back) appears behind the bar.

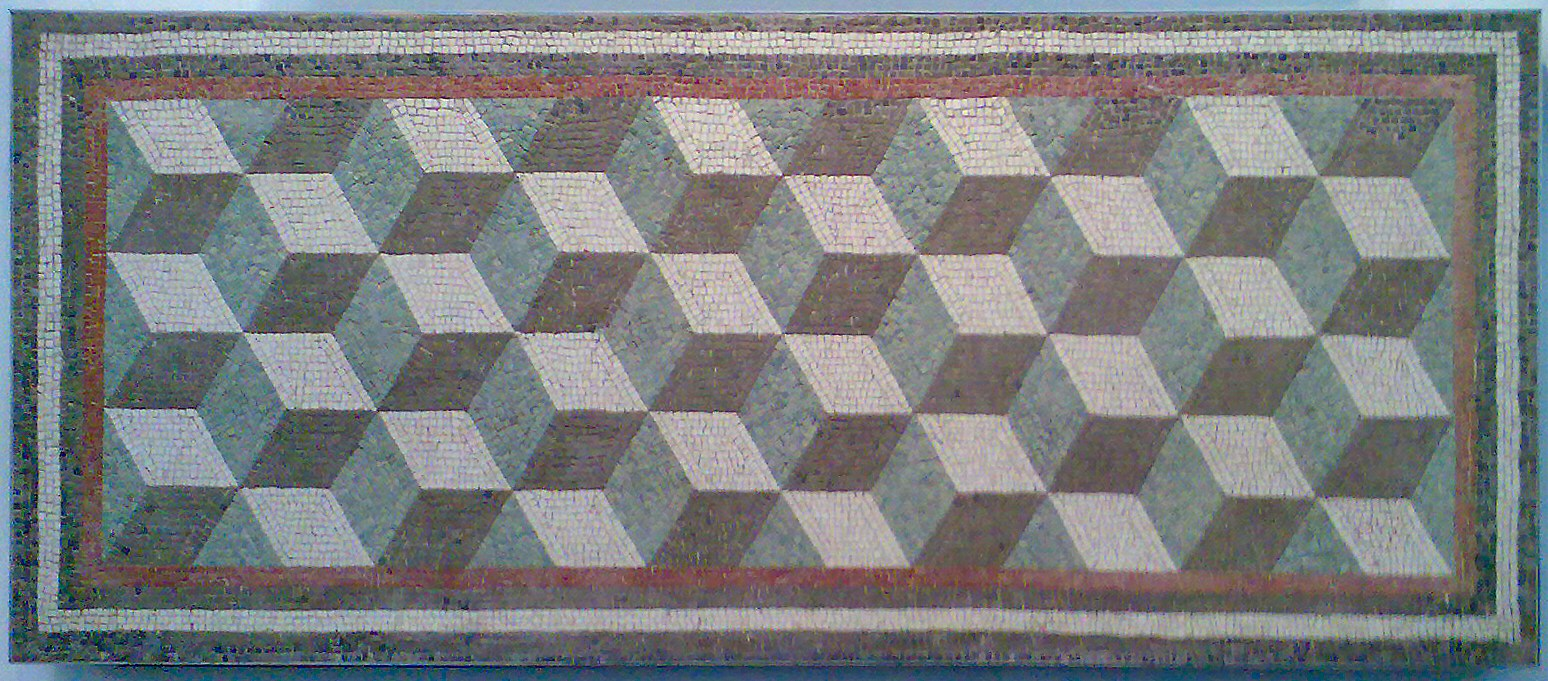
Ancient Roman mosaic

It is possible to cause the switch to occur by focusing on different parts of the cube. If one sees the first interpretation on the right it is possible to cause a switch to the second by focusing on the base of the cube until the switch occurs to the second interpretation. Similarly, if one is viewing the second interpretation, focusing on the left side of the cube may cause a switch to the first.

The orientation of the Necker cube can also be altered by shifting the observer's point of view. When seen from apparent above, one face tends to be seen closer; and in contrast, when seen from a subjective viewpoint that is below, a different face comes to the fore.

The Necker cube has shed light on the human visual system. The phenomenon has served as evidence of the human brain being a neural network with two distinct equally possible interchangeable stable states. Sidney Bradford, blind from the age of ten months but regaining his sight following an operation at age 52, did not perceive the ambiguity that normal-sighted observers do, but rather perceived only a flat image.

During the 1970s, undergraduates in the Psychology Department of City University, London, were provided with assignments to measure their Introversion-Extroversion orientations by the time it took for them to switch between the Front and Back perceptions of the Necker Cube.

== References in academia and popular culture ==
The Necker cube is discussed to such extent in Robert J. Sawyer's 1998 science fiction novel Factoring Humanity that "Necker" becomes a verb, meaning to impel one's brain to switch from one perspective or perception to another.

The Necker cube is also used to illustrate how vampires in Peter Watts' science fiction novels Blindsight (2006) and Echopraxia (2014) have superior pattern recognition skills. One of the pieces of evidence is that vampires can see both interpretations of the Necker Cube simultaneously, which sets them apart from baseline humanity.

Cultural critic Benjamin Kirbach uses the figure of the Necker cube as the basis for what he calls neckerology. Kirbach draws on concepts ranging from object-oriented ontology, speculative realism, and new materialism to show that even the average everyday objects we encounter only ever appear to us through partial aspects and profiles (what phenomenologists call "adumbration"). Like a Necker cube, these aspects and profiles can only become perceptible through the occlusion of other aspects and profiles that remain hidden from view. Kirbach also reveals that Necker himself, whose full name is Louis Albert Necker de Saussure, is the first-cousin once-removed of renowned linguist Ferdinand de Saussure. The latter Saussure's division of the linguistic sign into signifier versus signified—what he called a "two-sided psychological entity [une entité psychique à deux faces]"—is perhaps not unlike the perpetual push-and-pull of a Necker cube. "[B]y dividing it into signifier and signified," Kirbach writes, "we might say that Saussure himself 'neckerized' the sign".

== See also ==
- Ambigram
- Binocular rivalry
- Multistable perception
- Pareidolia
- Rhombille tiling
- Schroeder stairs
- Spinning Dancer
