= Jos De Mey =

Belgian photorealist painter

Jos De Mey (Sint-Denijs-Westrem, 10 February 1928 – Ghent, 22 December 2007) was a Flemish-Belgian painter. He is primarily known for depictions of impossible objects in a photo-realistic style, with acrylic paintings constituting the majority of his work. He frequently depicted characters of other artists – notably Magritte, M. C. Escher, and Bruegel.

Prior to his focus on painting he studied and taught interior design and color harmony at the Royal Academy of Fine Arts in Ghent, and was a prolific designer of furniture in the Scandinavian mid-century modern style, particularly for Van Den Berghe-Pauvers.

At the time of his death De Mey resided in Zomergem, Belgium.
