= Oscar Reutersvärd =

Swedish artist (1915–2002)

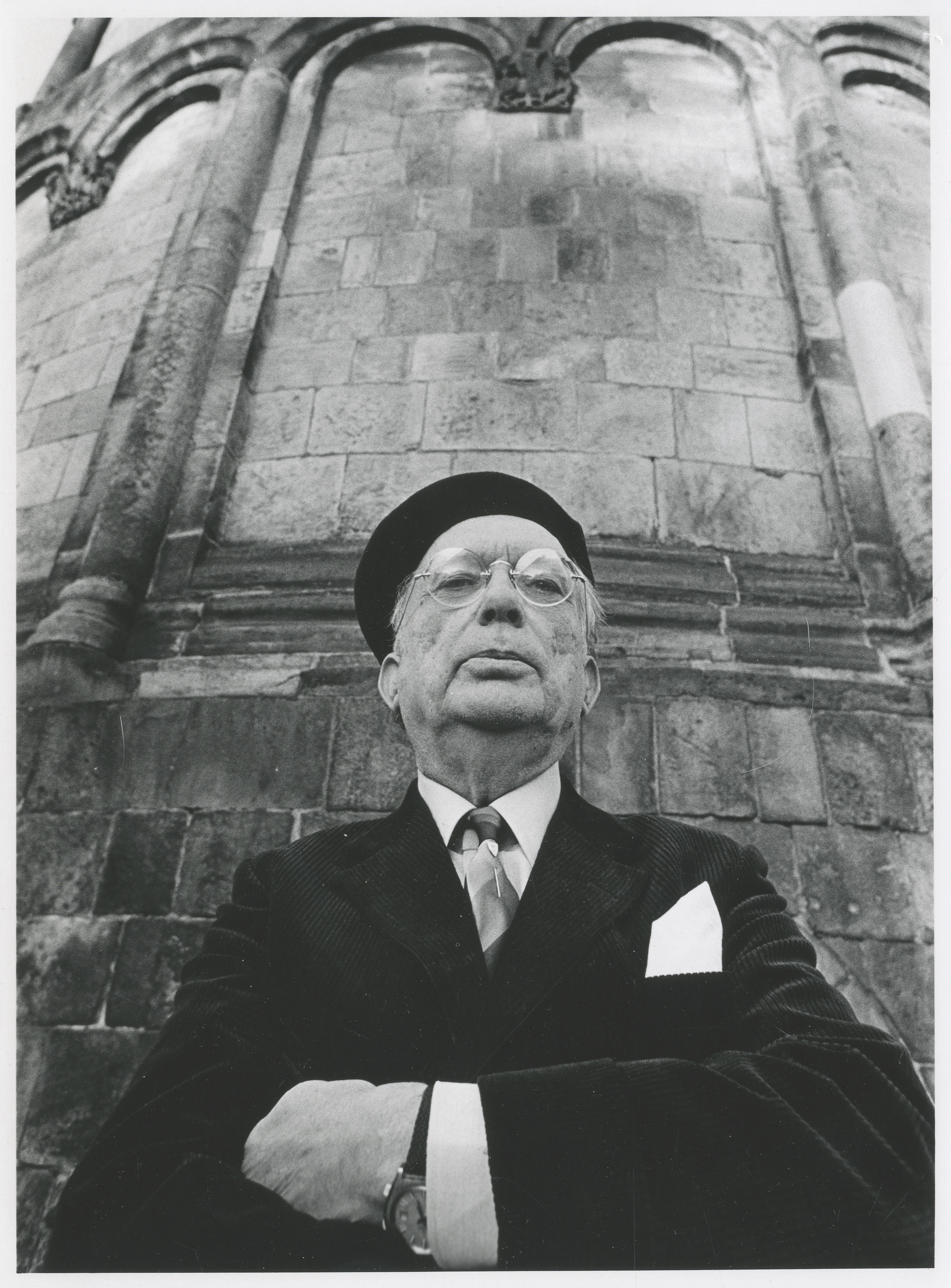
- Oscar Reutersvärd in 1986
- Born: 29 November 1915; Stockholm, Sweden
- Died: 2 February 2002 (aged 86); Lund, Sweden
- Notable work: Impossible figures

Oscar Reutersvärd (Swedish pronunciation: [ˈɔskar ˈrø̂jtəʂvæ̂ːɖ]; 29 November 1915 – 2 February 2002) was a Swedish graphic artist, who in 1934 pioneered the art of 3D drawings that may initially appear feasible, yet cannot be physically constructed. He is sometimes described as "the father of the impossible figure", although there are much older examples, e.g. Hogarth's Satire on False Perspective.

== Biography ==
Born on 29 November 1915 in Stockholm, Sweden, he reportedly suffered from dyslexia and had difficulty estimating the distance and size of objects. But his family was artistic, and encouraged his painting and sculpture efforts at home.

== Work ==
Reutersvärd’s triangle

Reutersvärd's originality appeared early in his career—at the age of 18. In 1934, the school student created a figure, the "impossible triangle", composed of a series of cubes in perspective. "the triangle at first seems like the simple geometrical shape with which all schoolchildren are familiar. However, as the eye tries to follow its outlines, the triangle abruptly becomes a dizzying experience as its bottom link plays havoc with the brain's intuitive knowledge of physical laws." according to World of Mathematics, 2006, published by Thomson Gale. This very triangle was chosen in 1982 by the government of Sweden as the subject of a 25 öre postage stamp. In 1937, he created his first impossible stairs, and the concept that would lead to the impossible fork. Subsequently, he focused on academics. In 1958, he read the now classic article by Lionel and Roger Penrose on impossible objects, which included the triangle and staircase that the British father and son team had developed independently, drawing inspiration from the works of dutch graphic artist M.C. Escher— who after reading the article, in turn, produced two prints of impossible buildings in 1961 and 1962. The application of the concepts he originated over 20 years prior, by serious mathematicians and artists, rekindled Reutersvärd's interest. By 1963, he had created several new and original impossible figures, and was featured by a gallery in Stockholm.

He would create his figures with India ink on Japanese rice paper, drawing freehand, without a ruler or any mechanical device. He generally used "Japanese perspective, where all parallel lines remain parallel and do not meet at points of visual convergence." The shaky lines, often exacerbated by working on the ten-hour train ride between Stockholm and Lund, is obvious in some of his pictures. Figures were frequently colored with Japanese colored chalk. In comparing his work to that of the much more famous artist of the impossible, M. C. Escher, it can be observed that Escher builds inhabited worlds around impossible objects, whereas Reutersvärd's designs generally consist of pure geometric forms.

Reutersvärd produced more than 2,500 figures. In the late 1960s, several books were published featuring his work, and he attracted a following, with many international gallery exhibitions. Through the 1980s and 1990s, he continued to develop impossible figures, filling many notebooks. Finally, in the mid 1990s, his work was prominently commissioned for several public buildings in Sweden, and the Nationalmuseum and Moderna Museet both displayed his work.

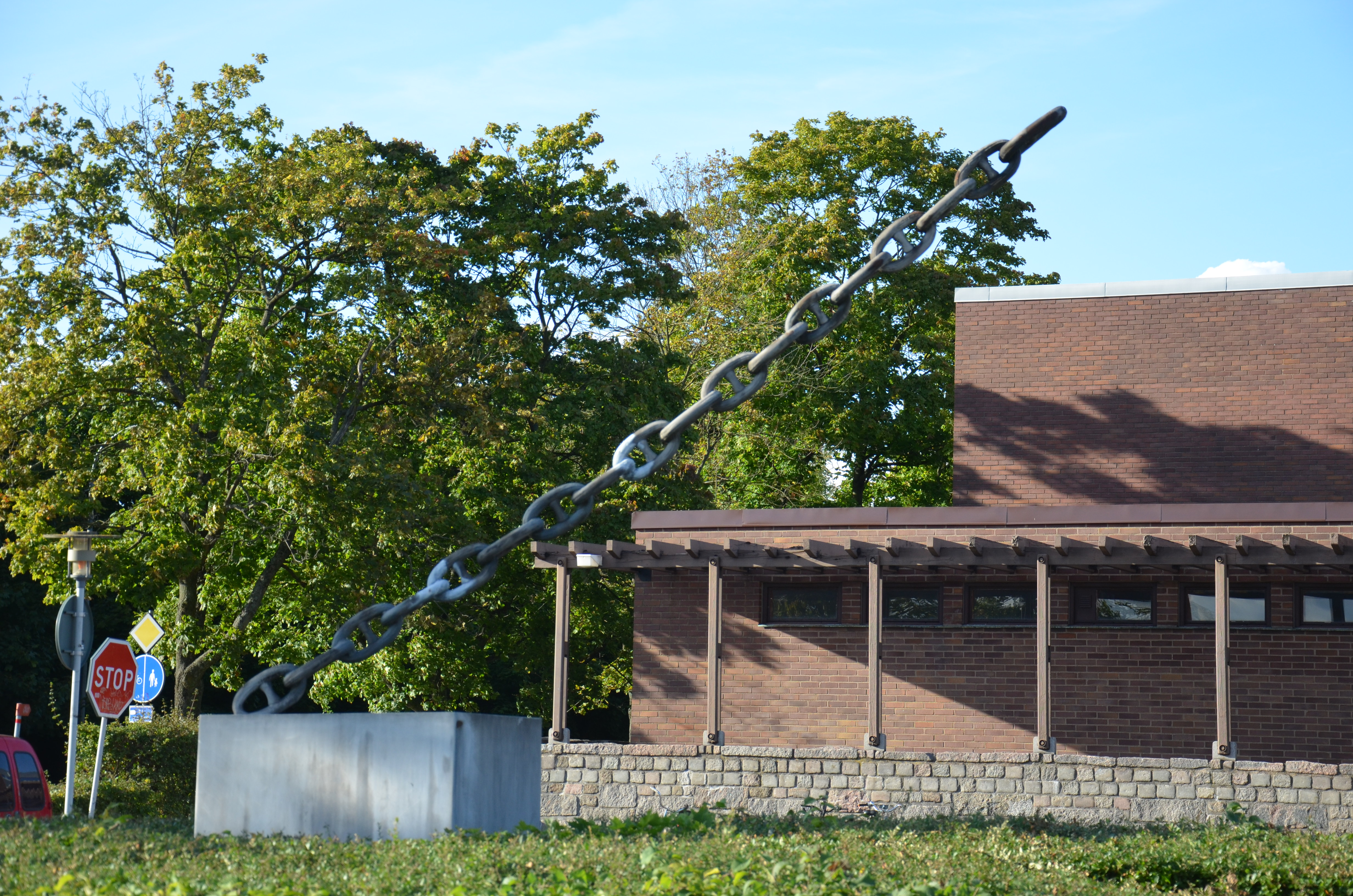
Tungt flygande flykt (Heavy flying escape) in Lund Sweden, 1962

Today both mathematicians and psychologists use his drawings as templates for studying visual perception.

In addition to his development of impossible figures, he was a designer of many public works in Sweden, including large sculptures, mazes and architectural features.

Oscar Reutersvärd gave at the annual mathematical conference Incontri con la matematica in Castel San Pietro Terme, Bologna, Italy, the ability to use his figures for its publications.

== Swedish postage stamps ==
Reutersvärd's achievements were honoured in 1982 by a series of three Swedish postage stamps. The stamps were engraved by Czesław Słania, based on watercolours by Reutersvärd. They remained in circulation for only about two years, after which they were withdrawn when the postage rate was changed. The Swedish government had the unused stamps destroyed; these scarce items are now eagerly sought collectibles.
