= Relativity (M. C. Escher) =

Print by M. C. Escher

- Artist: M. C. Escher
- Completion date: December 1953
- Type: Lithograph
- Dimensions: 27.7 cm × 29.2 cm (10.9 in × 11.5 in)

Relativity is a lithograph print by the Dutch artist M. C. Escher, first printed in December 1953. The first version of this work was a woodcut made earlier that same year.

It depicts a paradoxical architectural structure in which the normal laws of gravity do not apply. The structure has many stairways at various angles. There are several figures walking along the various angles of the structure. What are walls to some figures others are standing upon as floors. Two of the stairways are double-sided with one figure walking below another upside-down. There are windows and doorways leading to park-like outdoor settings. The structure seems to be the center of an idyllic community, with most of its inhabitants casually strolling and one dining at an outdoor table. Yet all the figures are dressed in identical attire and have featureless bulb-shaped heads.

== In popular culture ==
Relativity is one of Escher's most popular works. The piece was described by Alastair Sooke in 2015 as "one of the most familiar images in modern art" and has influenced many works, such as the films Labyrinth (1986) and Inception (2010).
