= Waterfall (M. C. Escher) =

Lithograph print by M. C. Escher

- Artist: M. C. Escher
- Year: 1961
- Type: Lithograph
- Dimensions: 38 cm × 30 cm (15 in × 12 in)

Waterfall (Dutch: Waterval) is a lithograph by the Dutch artist M. C. Escher, first printed in October 1961. It shows a perpetual motion machine where water from the base of a waterfall appears to run downhill along the water path before reaching the top of the waterfall.

While most two-dimensional artists use relative proportions to create an illusion of depth, Escher here and elsewhere uses conflicting proportions to create a visual paradox. The watercourse supplying the waterfall (its aqueduct or leat) has the structure of three Penrose triangles. A Penrose triangle is an impossible object designed by Oscar Reutersvärd in 1934, and found independently by Roger Penrose in 1958.

== Description ==
The image depicts a watermill with an elevated aqueduct and waterwheel as the main feature. The aqueduct begins at the waterwheel and flows behind it. The walls of the aqueduct step downward, suggesting that it slopes downhill. The aqueduct turns sharply three times, first to the left, then to the right, and finally to the left again. The viewer looks down at the scene diagonally, which means that from the viewer's perspective the aqueduct appears to be slanted upward. The viewer is also looking across the scene diagonally from the lower right, which means that from the viewer's perspective the two left-hand turns are directly in line with each other, while the waterwheel, the forward turn and the end of the aqueduct are all in line. The second left-hand turn is supported by pillars from the first, while the other two corners are supported by a tower of pillars that begins at the waterwheel. The water falls off the edge of the aqueduct and over the waterwheel in an impossible infinite cycle; in his notes on the picture, Escher points out that some water must be periodically added to this perpetual motion machine to compensate for evaporation. The use of the Penrose stairs is paralleled by Escher's Ascending and Descending (1960), where instead of the flow of water, two lines of monks endlessly march uphill or downhill around the four flights of stairs.

The two support towers continue above the aqueduct and are topped by two compound polyhedra, revealing Escher's interest in mathematics as an artist. The one on the left is a compound of three cubes. The one on the right is a stellation of a rhombic dodecahedron (or a compound of three non-regular octahedra) and is known as Escher's solid.

Below the mill is a garden of bizarre, giant plants. This is a magnified view of a cluster of moss and lichen that Escher drew in ink as a study in 1942.

The background seems to be a climbing expanse of terraced farmland.

== See also ==
- First stellation of rhombic dodecahedron
- Monument Valley, a puzzle game featuring an Escher-like waterfall and similar impossible structures
