= Impossible trident =

2D drawing of impossible 3D object

An impossible trident with backgrounds, to enhance the illusion

Roger Hayward's Undecidable Monument

An impossible trident, also known as an impossible fork, blivet, poiuyt, or devil's tuning fork, is a drawing of an impossible object (undecipherable figure), a kind of an optical illusion. It appears to have three cylindrical prongs at one end which then mysteriously transform into two rectangular prongs at the other end.

In 1964, D. H. Schuster reported that he noticed an ambiguous figure of a new kind in the advertising section of an aviation journal. He dubbed it a "three-stick clevis". He described the novelty as follows: "Unlike other ambiguous drawings, an actual shift in visual fixation is involved in its perception and resolution." The word "poiuyt" appeared on the March 1965 cover of Mad magazine bearing the four-eyed Alfred E. Neuman balancing the impossible fork on his finger with caption "Introducing 'The Mad Poiuyt'" (the last six letters on the top row of QWERTY typewriters, right to left). An anonymously contributed version described as a "hole location gauge" was printed in the June 1964 issue of Analog Science Fiction and Fact, with the comment that "this outrageous piece of draftsmanship evidently escaped from the Finagle & Diddle Engineering Works". Subsequently, a correspondent revealed that he had encountered the type of figure about twenty years previously, and had used it as a business logo since 1952.

The term "blivet" for the impossible fork was popularized by Worm Runner's Digest magazine. In 1967, Harold Baldwin published there an article, "Building better blivets", in which he described the rules for the construction of drawings based on the impossible fork. In December 1968, American optical designer and artist Roger Hayward wrote a humorous submission "Blivets—Research and Development" for The Worm Runner's Digest in which he presented various drawings based on the blivet, with a short sequel the following year. The article was reprinted later in an anthology; in an introduction to the article, James V. McConnell "explained" the term as follows: "The blivet was first discovered in 1892 in Pfulingen, Germany, by a cross-eyed dwarf named Erasmus Wolfgang Blivet." Hayward also published another sequel, Blivets—the Makin's.
