= Atrani =

- Comune
- Comune di Atrani
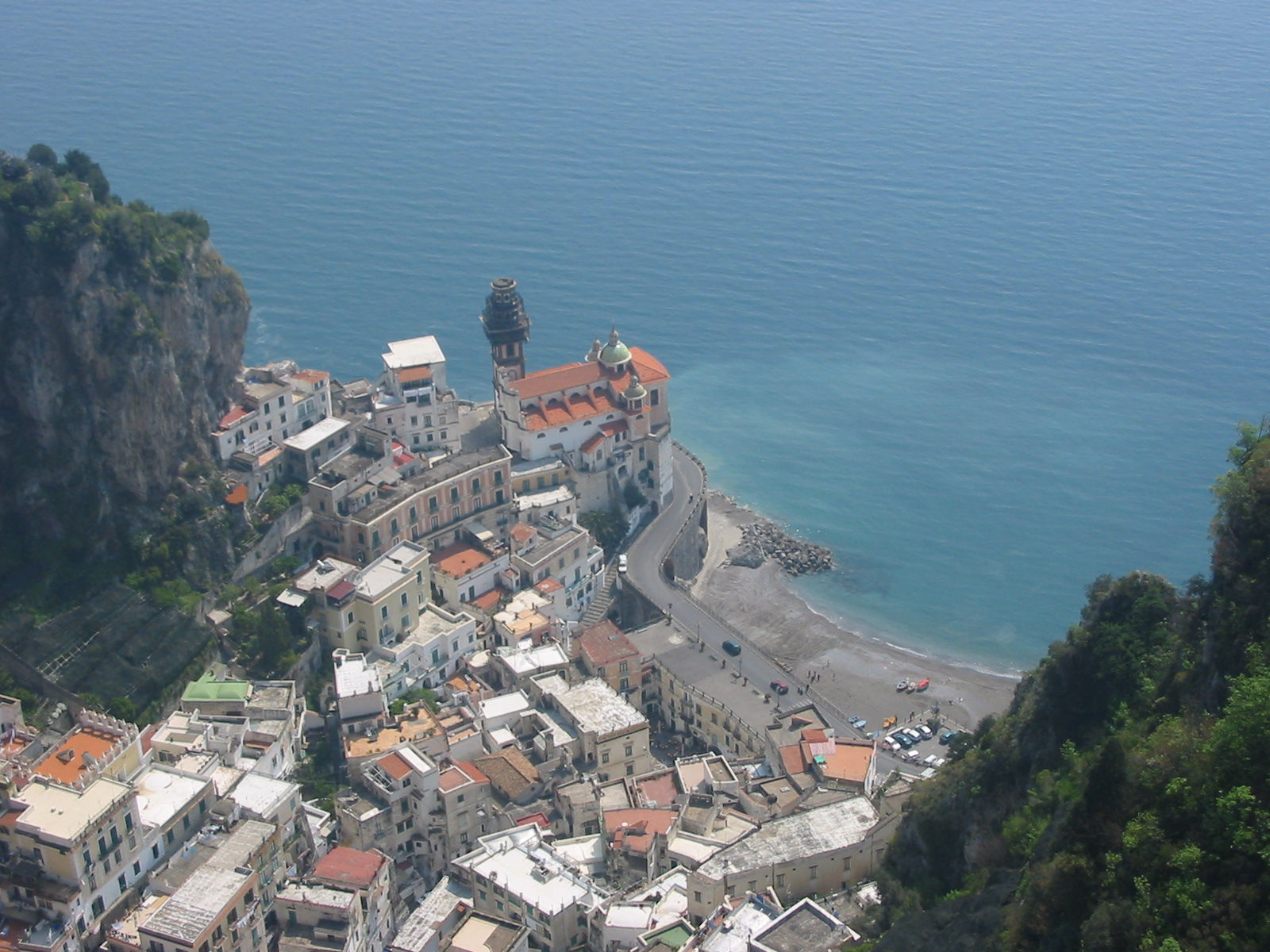
- Panoramic view

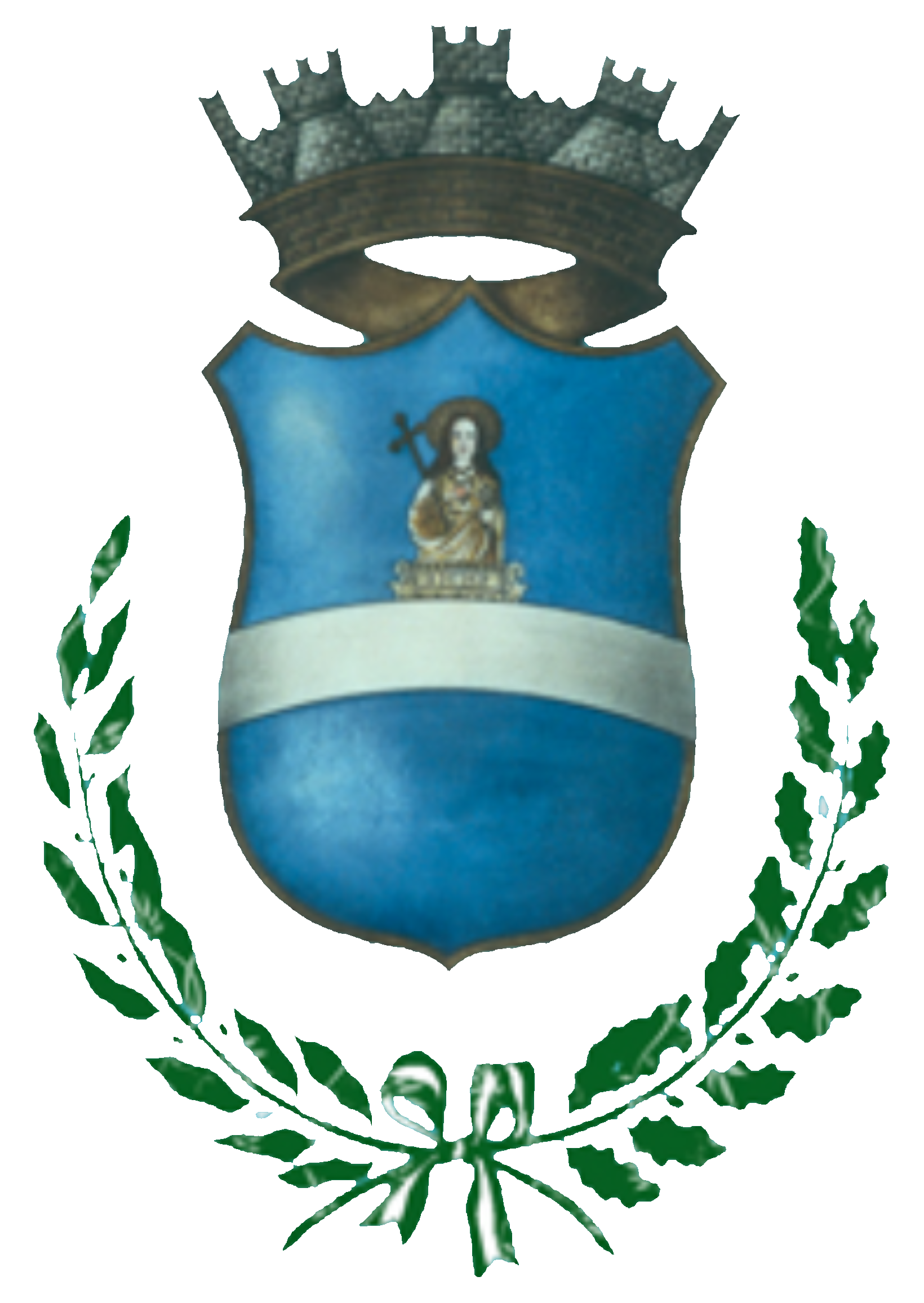
- Coat of arms

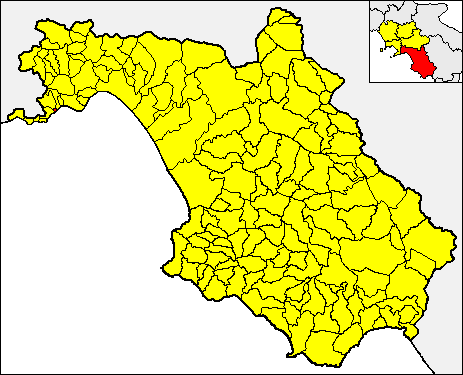
- Atrani within the Province of Salerno

- Location within Italy Location within Campania
- Coordinates: 40°38′N 14°37′E
- Country: Italy
- Region: Campania
- Province: Salerno (SA)

Government
  - Mayor: Michele Siravo (civic list "Atrani Futura") from June 9, 2024

Area
  - Total: 0.12 km^{2} (0.046 sq mi)
- Elevation: 21 m (69 ft)

Population (2025)
  - Total: 764
  - Density: 6,400/km^{2} (16,000/sq mi)
- Demonym: Atranesi
- Time zone: UTC+1 (CET)
  - Summer (DST): UTC+2 (CEST)
- Postal code: 84010
- Dialing code: 089
- ISTAT code: 065011
- Patron saint: St. Mary Magdalene
- Website: Official website

UNESCO World Heritage Site
- Part of: Costiera Amalfitana
- Criteria: Cultural: (ii)(iv)
- Reference: 830
- Inscription: 1997 (21st Session)
- Area: 11,206 ha (27,690 acres)
- Buffer zone: 11,857 ha (29,300 acres)

Atrani is a village and comune on the Amalfi Coast in the province of Salerno in the Campania region of south-western Italy. It is located to the east of Amalfi, several minutes' drive down the coast of the Tyrrhenian Sea.

The municipality of Atrani has a land area of 12 ha (30 acres), making it the smallest in Italy. Its population was 832 in 2020. It is one of I Borghi più belli d'Italia ("The most beautiful villages of Italy").

== Geography ==
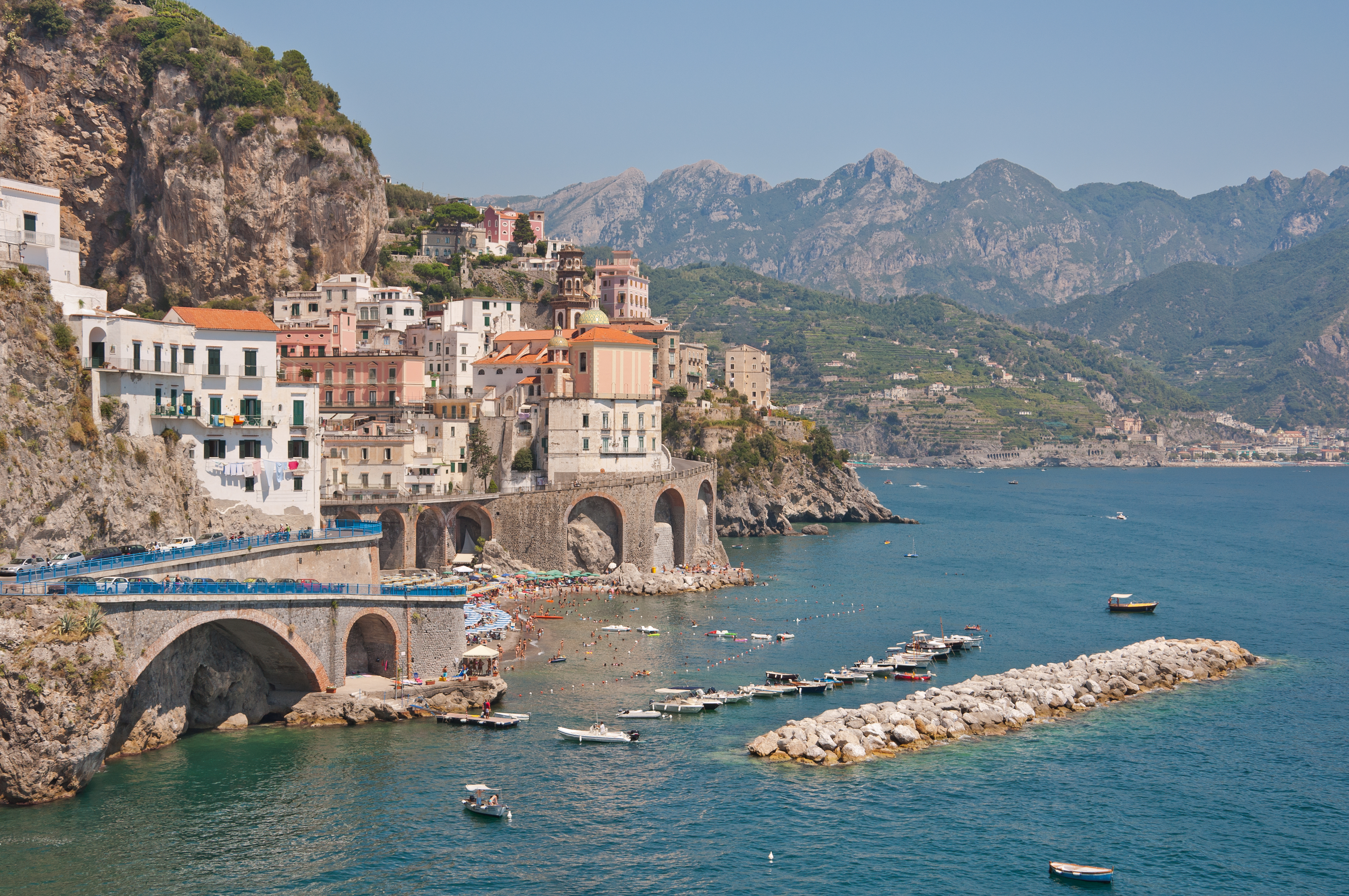
View of Atrani from the coast

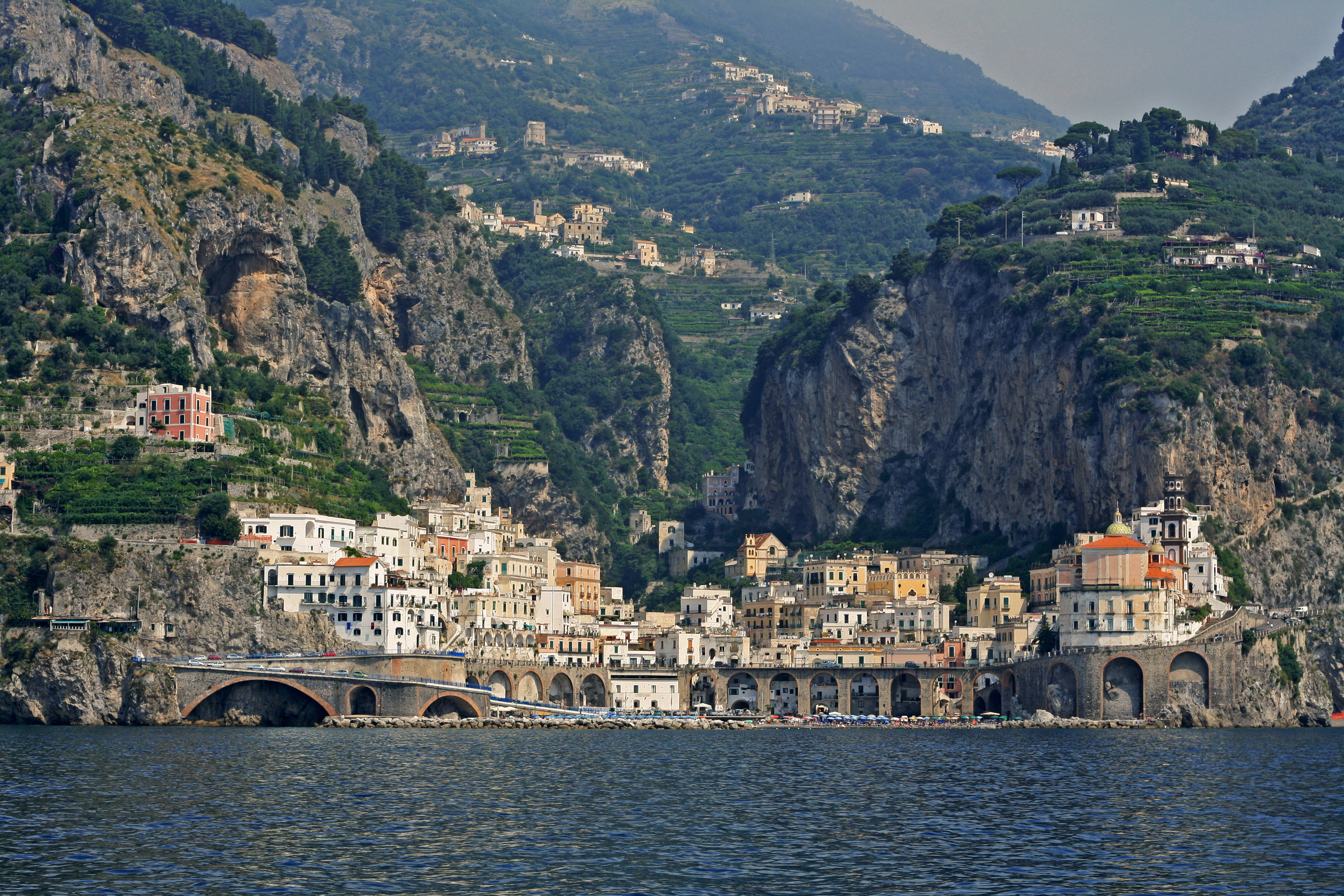
View of Atrani and the Amalfi Coast from the Tyrrhenian Sea

The town is located between the Civita Hill and Aureo Hill. Atrani is along the valley of the river Dragone, named for a legend saying there once was a terrible dragon that would breathe fire and would hide himself there.

Though it is part of the Amalfi Coast, it is the only town along the coast to preserve intact its antique, traditional characteristics.

The initial houses face the beach directly. They are grouped around the square and move around the church of San Salvatore and the marble fountain before going up towards the valley and climbing along the rocky mountain and crossing the gardens and the lemon fields. Atrani is isolated from automobile traffic because it is protected by its antique houses with flowered balconies. The central square of Atrani leads directly to the beach and the sea by crossing an antique passageway created to save boats from sea storms.

== Climate ==
Atrani boasts a Mediterranean climate, with mild and rainy winters and summers that are moderately hot, very sunny and almost never foggy.

For the 30-year period from 1961 to 1990 the average temperature of the coldest month, January, was 10.7 degrees Celsius (51 degrees F); the temperature of the hottest month, August, was 26.8 degrees Celsius (80 degrees F).

== Demographics ==
Historical population

Year	Pop.	±%
1861	2,579	—
1871	2,694	+4.5%
1881	2,746	+1.9%
1901	2,070	−24.6%
1911	1,412	−31.8%
1921	1,157	−18.1%
1931	1,058	−8.6%
1936	1,182	+11.7%

Year	Pop.	±%
1951	1,250	+5.8%
1961	1,499	+19.9%
1971	1,190	−20.6%
1981	1,115	−6.3%
1991	1,029	−7.7%
2001	965	−6.2%
2011	887	−8.1%
2021	802	−9.6%

Source: ISTAT

== History ==
=== Early history and Roman period ===
The origins of Atrani are still unknown. Archeological research discovered ruins remaining from the 1st century AD. Roman villas existed along the Amalfi Coast and were covered in debris from the eruption of Vesuvius in 79 AD. The debris was deposited on the mountains encircling Atrani and from there it was dumped into the valley. In the 5th century AD, barbarians attacked and numerous Romans escaped from the cities. They fled onto Monti Lattari and created stable settlements. The first documented proof of the existence of Atrani is represented by a letter by the Pope Gregory I to Bishop Pimenio of Amalfi dated 596 AD.

=== Duchy of Amalfi ===
The Duchy of Amalfi extended from Positano to Cetara and also included Agerola, Pimonte, Lettere, Capri and the archipelago of Sirenuse (Li Galli). Within this territory Atrani was a village that boasted the title of city, the twin city of Amalfi was seat of the aristocracy. The Pantaleoni, the richest and most powerful family of Amalfi, the Alagno, the Mauro Comite, the Comite Iane, the Augustariccio, and the Viarecta families resided there. Its inhabitants preserved their identity as Atranese (from Atrani), unlike all the other inhabitants of the duchy, who were merely called Amalfitani.

Only Amalfi and Atrani had the right to elect or depose the leaders of the towns. Amalfi was first ruled by counts, then by prefects, judges, and then finally by the Dukes (not doges, as is sometimes erroneously said). The Duke concentrated in his person both civil and military power. The symbol of his power was a hat, the "birecto", which the dukes were awarded in a coronation in the palatine chapel of S. Salvatore de Birecto of Atrani.

The village of Atrani was more extensive than its current borders and protected by massive fortifications. It extended as far as Castiglione (now part of the municipality of Ravello), and was so named from the castellio, which was a large castle situated on the promontory where the collegiate church of St. Mary Magdalene stands today. In the Civita area there was the Castle of Supramonte, which was destroyed by attacks by the Republic of Pisa between 1135 and 1137. There was also the coastal tower of "Tumulo" or "San Francisco", built in 500 by Don Parafan de Ribera to defend against the Turks who, after the defeat of the Christian fleet at Djerba near Tunis in 1560, would eventually overrun the coast.

Atrani contributed to the economic and social development of the duchy. Atrani had prosperous pasta and fabric factories that produced sajette and precious fabrics. This commerce made Atrani the pride of the coast. They were particularly active east of the duchy, in Paestum, Cava de' Tirreni and Vietri sul Mare. Atrani's economic success saw it plagued by many raids by the Republic of Pisa in the 12th century.

In 987 Amalfi was promoted to the rank of archdiocese by Pope John XV. The first archbishop Leone di Sergio di Urso Comite, who was from Atrani. Atrani had a flourishing religious life, with about three hundred churches and chapels in the city. Monte Maggiore (now Mount Aureo) housed six monasteries, the oldest of the region.

In the second half of 1100, Manfredi punished Atrani for siding in favour of the pope in the struggle between the papacy and the empire and sent 1000 Alexandrian sailors against Atrani. The inhabitants of Atrani fled to Amalfi, and the mercenaries settled in the village, and it would be many years before they abandoned it. The departure of the mercenaries is attributed to the intercession of St. Mary Magdalene. Small traces of the occupation still remain today, in the cadence of the local dialect and a handful of words.

The Earthquake of 1343 struck the Tyrrhenian Sea, and the resultant tsunami ravaged the ports along the Amalfi Coast, including Atrani's. The effects of the tsunami were observed by the poet Petrarch, whose ship was forced to return to port, and recorded in the fifth book of his Epistolae familiares. In the years that followed, Atrani's fortunes were tied to those of Amalfi, whose duchy had fallen and been incorporated into the Principality of Salerno.

=== Modern era ===
In 1647, Masaniello, instigator of an uprising in Naples against Spanish control, was hunted by soldiers of the Duke of Arcos, the Viceroy of Naples. He returned to Atrani to hide in what has since been called the 'Cave of Masaniello', a cave not far from the hero's mother's house. Born in Naples in 1620, Masaniello, whose full name was Tommaso Aniello d'Amalfi, was the son of Francis of Amalfi and Antonia Gargano of Atrani. He was a fishmonger, but was known in the Piazza del Mercato in Naples for his skill as a smuggler.

The Neapolitan Republic or 'Royal Republic' (Italian: Real Repubblica) was proclaimed under the protection of France and Masaniello was acclaimed as "Captain-General of the Neapolitan People." The power went to his head and he fell into a series of excesses that made him unpopular with the people. On July 16, 1647, he was killed. The Neapolitan Republic lasted until the following April, when it succumbed to the Spanish.

In 1643 the Great Plague killed many Atranese. On 22 June 1807, Joseph Bonaparte, King of Naples, went on an official visit to the Amalfi Coast. Struck by the beauty of the place in Amalfi and Atrani in particular, he promised to build a road that would make it easier to access the Kingdom of the Amalfi. This road, begun by Joachim Murat in 1816, was only completed in 1854.

=== Floods ===
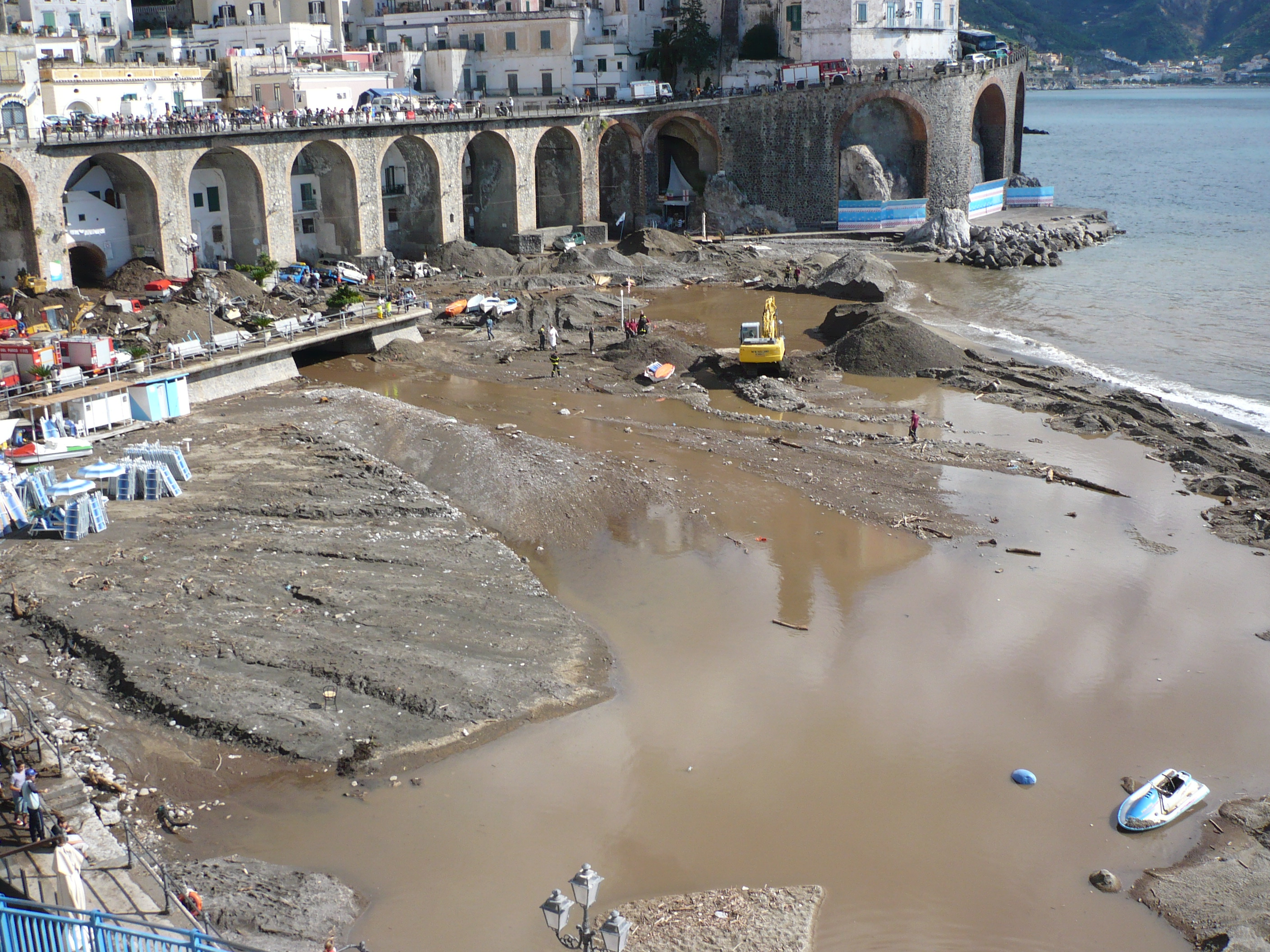
The beach in Atrani after the flood of 2010

On 10 September 2010 the Dragone burst its banks following a flood and overflowed along the main street of the city. The river was full of mud, and carried away everything in its path. A girl named Francesca Mansi died. Her body was found months later near the Aeolian Islands.

== Main sights ==
=== Church of San Salvatore de' Birecto ===
Built in the 10th century, the church has a square plan with front porch and is divided into three naves with barrel vaults. It was originally facing west (entrance in Via Arte della Lana). In the Baroque period the current facade was built with the clock, the staircase and atrium. At the time of the Amalfi Republic, the church was the palace chapel where they were crowned the dukes and where they deposited their ashes.

The oldest pieces in the church are a tombstone of the 14th century, depicting the noble lady Atranese Filippa Napolitano and a marble slab of the 12th century, depicting two peacocks. The peacock, sacred to Juno, was revered by many Eastern peoples as a symbol of vanity and pride, well represented by the people and goods of Amalfi. The peacocks are also a symbol of resurrection. Doors of bronze, made in 1087, were donated to the church by Pantaleone III, a nobleman from Amalfi. The door is divided into tiles of depicted scenes, containing the image of Christ, the Madonna and some saints. It is now housed in the church of Santa Maria Maddalena.

=== Church of the Immaculate Conception ===
Located next to the church of San Salvatore de' Birecto, it consists of a single nave with a barrel vault. Curiously, the main altar in polychrome marble is facing west, in contrast to the medieval model. Embedded in the wall there is a Roman cinerary urn used as a water reservoir. Originally the bronze doors of the church of San Salvatore de' Birecto were destined for this church.

=== Collegiate Church of St. Mary Magdalene Penitent ===
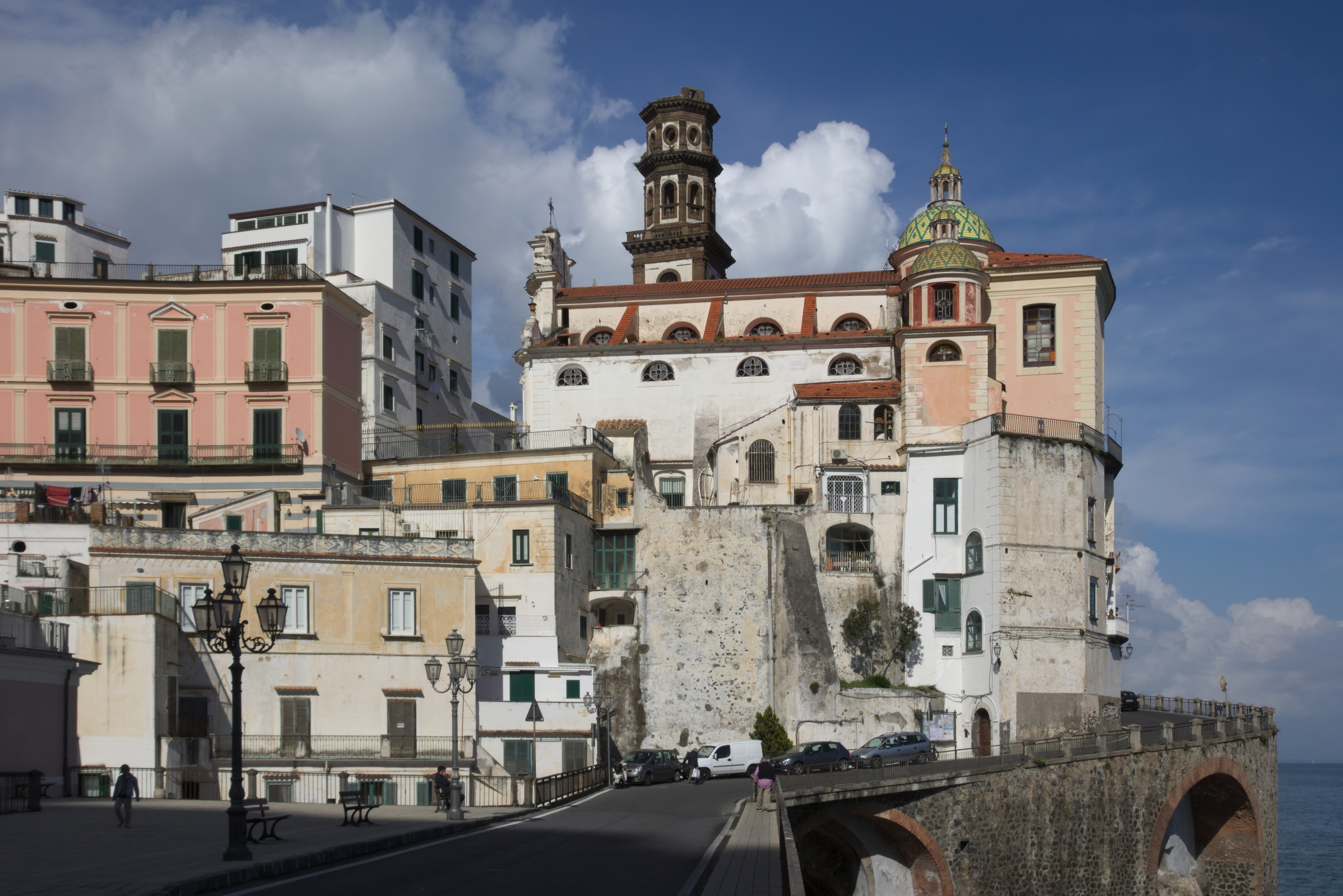
A view of the Collegiate Church of St Mary Magdalene (Italian: Santa Maria Maddalena)

The Collegiate Church of St Mary Magdalene was founded in 1274 on the ruins of a medieval fortress on the initiative of Atrani. Over time the church has undergone considerable restoration. In 1570, near collapse, funds were raised by special taxes on wheat and export of manufactured goods to restore the church.

The building underwent a second operation almost a century later, in 1669. On that occasion it also repaired the sacristy which was equipped with an external counter. In 1753, as the population grew the church was enlarged and expanded by donations from private citizens in addition to the contribution of municipal regiment. It was during this work that the fortress was finally demolished in order to free up additional space enlargement. In recent times, it was renovated by the architect Lorenzo Casalbore of Salerno.

The church is decorated with two transepts. One ceiling is covered externally with tiles; the other has a flat roof. There are numerous statues and paintings placed in various side chapels: The Madonna shepherdess (famous sculpture of 1789) and The Incredulity of St. Thomas (work of the 16th century Salerno Andrea Sabatini). The facade of the church is considered "the only example of Rococo on the Amalfi Coast". The terrace of the sacristy overlooks the Gulf of Salerno as the Belvedere of Villa Cimbrone. The bell tower, with its brown tuff, is reminiscent of the Madonna del Carmine in Naples.

=== Church of San Michele Arcangelo ("Camposantino") ===
This is St. Michael's Outside the Walls because it is located outside the ancient walls of the city, near the North Gate, bordering Ravello. It was built between the 11th and 12th centuries, deriving from a cavity from Mount Civita. It is reached via a flight of stairs and at the top there is the bell tower. The interior of the church is trapezoidal and shows the sloping walls of the rock. The church was used as a cemetery (until 1927) and was a mass grave during the plague of 1656. The altar was created in the Baroque style and is a painting of Cretella dated 1930, depicting the Holy Warrior. To the left of the altar, a staircase leads to a small chapel, very similar to the chapel in the abbey of Santa Maria Oleari.

=== Torre dello Ziro ===
The fortress is situated on the Monte Aureo, overlooking the town of Amalfi and Atrani and is located on the territory of Scala. The exact date of construction is unknown, but the imprint Aragonese suggests the 15th century. The structure, flanked by bastions and turrets, was made in conjunction with another castle on the north, near Pontoon. The ruins of this castle can still be seen.

The fame of the construction is related to the story of Giovanna d'Aragona, Duchess of Amalfi. She was the granddaughter of Ferdinand I of Aragon. At twelve years old, in 1490, she married Alfonso I Piccolomini, Duke of Amalfi, who in 1498, left her a widow and mother of a newborn son at the helm of the Duchy, which at that time was in poor financial shape. The young woman, against the will of his brothers, married Antonio Bologna, her butler, with whom she had a passionate love affair. The brothers tried to suppress the scandal and, after many deviations and daring escapes, imprisoned Giovanna and their children in the Torre dello Ziro. Here they were starved to death or, according to the most reliable report, strangled, while Bologna was stabbed to death at the hands of assassins. These events inspired Matteo Bandello to write his twenty-fourth novel. Two tragedies were taken from this: The Duchess of Malfi by John Webster and El Mayordomo de la Duquesa de Amalfi by Lope de Vega.

=== Church of Our Lady of Mount Carmel ===
Built in 1601 on the initiative of Scipio Cretella and Giambattista Vollaro, the church's façade is quite simple, though bell-tower built in Moorish style is valuable. The interior is decorated in Baroque style, consisting of a single nave with a barrel vault. On the altar is a 15th-century fresco depicting the Madonna, which tradition says was caused by a kiosk that stood in the place of the church. The building houses a Nativity scene, set up during the holiday season, whose characters are faithful reproductions of Atrani men and women during this period. The location and size of the statues are directly proportional to the wealth represented: they were in fact the same people who commissioned and paid the characters.

=== Cave and House of Masaniello ===
Tradition has it that a man, Masaniello, was hunted by soldiers of the viceroy of Naples and took refuge in this cave. It has been proven however, that a house not far from this belonged to the maternal family of Masaniello, who then was half Atranese.

=== Church of Santa Maria del Bando ===
This church was built in the 10th century on top of Mount Aureo. Restoration was carried out between the 12th and 13th centuries and therefore it has motifs typical of that era. The church has a single nave with a small sacristy. The floor was constructed in the 19th century, with square tiles with geometric patterns, from the Collegiate Church of Santa Maria Maddalena. The church is so named because legend tells that the Virgin pardoned a man, who was banished unjustly and sentenced to be hanged. The incident is depicted in the fresco above the altar, which depicts the Madonna and Child on the left and a man about to be hanged.

Inside the building is preserved cinerary urn of white marble, dating from the Julio-Claudian dynasty, belonged to a freedman of Claudius or Nero. The inscription of the urn testifies to the liberation that an imperial freedman, a noble of the royal family, granted to a woman who therefore, it is often assumed, has become her master's wife (a custom particularly common in the period between Augustus and Marcus Aurelius).

=== Grotto of the Saints ===
Below and not far from the Tower of Ziro is the Grotto of the Saints. It is a small natural cave, which opens onto a terrace planted with lemon trees. Its perimeter is an irregular quadrilateral and the walls are decorated with Byzantine-style frescoes, dating from the 12th century and depicting the four Evangelists. This cave is what remains of the Benedictine monastery of Saints Quirico and Giuditta male, founded in 986 by Archbishop Leo I.

== Religion ==
The majority of the population is Roman Catholic belonging to the Archdiocese of Amalfi-Cava de' Tirreni.

== In popular culture ==
M. C. Escher's first depiction of Atrani was his early and realistic work Atrani, Coast of Amalfi, a lithograph first printed in August 1931. Although that work is relatively unknown, the image of Atrani recurs several times in Escher's work, most notably in his much more famous series of Metamorphosis prints: Metamorphosis I, II and III.

Atrani was featured in a Fiat 500 USA advert entitled "Immigrants".

In the film The Equalizer 3, Atrani features as the fictional village of Altamonte.

In the Netflix streaming series Ripley, Atrani is where Dickie Greenleaf and his girlfriend Marge Sherwood are living.

== Twin towns ==
- Uggiano la Chiesa, Italy, since July 2006

== See also ==
- Amalfi Coast
- Sorrentine Peninsula
