= Enrico d'Aragona =

Enrico "Arrigo" d'Aragona (birth date unknown – 1478) was an illegitimate son of the King of Naples, Ferrante I of Aragon. Despite the circumstances of his birth he was well regarded by his father and granted the title of Marchese (Marquis) of Gerace in 1473. He was the father of Luigi (The Cardinal of Aragon) and Giovanna (The Duchess of Amalfi).

== Biography ==
Enrico was an illegitimate son of the King of Naples Ferrante I of Aragon and Giovanna Caracciolo. In May 1473 he was granted by his father the fief of Gerace, which recently had been freed from the dominion of the Caracciolo family and had become a state-owned city.

He married Polissena Ventimiglia. They had four children, Caterina, Luigi, and Giovanna and Carlo (twins born posthumously). Enrico is known for the dramatic circumstances of his death. He died after eating poisonous mushrooms in the Castle of Terranova da Sibari, where he had gone, as a guest of Marino Correale of Grotteria, to collect taxes for the King of Naples. Other people died along with him, while his brother Cesare, Marquis of Santa Agata, who also ate the mushrooms, survived.

He was succeeded as Marquis of Gerace, by his son Luigi (1474 - 1519), who in 1492 renounced the title to become Protonotary apostolic. Carlo, Enrico's posthumous son, then succeeded Luigi. Later, Luigi became a cardinal.

Giovanna married Alfonso Piccolomini, who became Duke of Amalfi in 1493. He was killed in 1498, stabbed in a fight with the Count of Celano, Carlo Sanframondi. Five months later, in March 1499, his son, also called Alfonso, was born and immediately invested as the Marquis of Amalfi as his father's only heir, with Giovanna as Regent.

== See also ==
- Torre dello Ziro
- Enrico d’Aragona (in Italian)
- Marino Correale (in Italian)
