= Alfonso Piccolomini =

Alfonso Piccolomini may refer to:

- Alfonso I Piccolomini (1468–1498), Duke of Amalfi
- Alfonso II Piccolomini (1499–1559), Duke of Amalfi and Captain-General of Siena
