= Malcontent (disambiguation) =

A malcontent is an early modern dramatic character type.

Malcontent(s) may also refer to:

- The Malcontent, a stage play by John Marston c.1603
- Malcontents (France), a political faction active between 1574 and 1576, during the French Wars of Religion
- Malcontents (Low Countries), a political faction active between 1578 and 1579, during the Eighty Years' War
