= Metamorphosis II =

Woodcut print by M. C. Escher

- Artist: M. C. Escher
- Year: 1939–1940
- Type: woodcut
- Dimensions: 19.2 cm × 389.5 cm (7.6 in × 153.3 in)

Metamorphosis II is a woodcut print by the Dutch artist M. C. Escher. It was created between November, 1939 and March, 1940. The print measures 19.2 by 389.5 centimetres (7 1/2 in × 12 ft 9 3/8 in) and was printed from 20 blocks on 3 combined sheets. Metamorphosis II is a long, horizontal piece which depicts animals and other forms gradually transforming into each other.

Like Metamorphosis I, the concept of the piece is to morph one image into a tessellated pattern and then slowly alter that pattern eventually to become a new image. The process begins with the word metamorphose (the Dutch form of the word metamorphosis) in a black rectangle, followed by several smaller metamorphose rectangles forming a grid pattern. This grid then becomes a black and white checkered pattern, which then becomes tessellations of reptiles, a honeycomb, insects, fish, birds and a pattern of three-dimensional blocks with red tops.

These blocks then become the architecture of the Italian coastal town of Atrani. Atrani is linked by a bridge to a tower in the water, which is simultaneously a rook standing on a chessboard. There are other chess pieces in the water and the water becomes a chessboard. The chessboard leads to a checkered wall, which then returns to the word metamorphose.

== Atrani and chess composition ==
M. C. Escher, Composition,
Metamorphosis II and III

Position: a8 black king, a7 black pawn, b7 black pawn, b6 black bishop, g4 black knight, a3 white rook, g2 white pawn, h2 white pawn, d1 white queen, f1 white rook, g1 black queen, h1 white king

White is in check, and therefore White has the move. White must play 1. Rxg1, after which Black can win by playing 1... Nf2#.

Among other motifs, Metamorphosis II depicts an Italian village known to Escher, as well as a legible chess composition.

Toward its right-hand side, the artwork depicts the coastline of Atrani, a small Italian village which Escher had rendered during his earlier career; Escher revisited the image of Atrani several times over the course of his life. In Metamorphosis II, a structure jutting from Atrani's coastline becomes a white rook on a chessboard. The chessboard is shown in full, with a legal position—because White is in check, White manifestly has the move. White has exactly one legal move, which is therefore forced: another white rook, standing on the square f1, must capture the black queen standing on g1. The white king cannot capture the black queen, because it would then be attacked by the black bishop standing on b6, thus remaining in check. Following 1. Rxg1, Black has exactly one checking move, which is mate: 1... Nf2#.

This implied sequence—and its attendant final position—illustrate several chess concepts. Black has played a queen sacrifice in order to secure mate following White's forced move. When mate is given, it is a smothered mate, in which the mated king is unable to move because surrounded by friendly pieces. Further, the black knight simultaneously attacks White's king and queen in the final position, thus delivering a royal fork.

Escher was an amateur player, participating in chess club play throughout his life. In correspondence with his son George, Escher expressed concern as to the reasonableness of the position shown in his Metamorphoses. However, he also noted that the position had never drawn any criticism, an indication of its status as a simple but well-formed problem.

The Atrani-chess dyad shown in Metamorphosis II was used again in Metamorphosis III. The latter was a greatly expanded version of the former, which Escher executed near the end of his life. However, the town-and-chess position were identical in both pieces. For Metamorphosis III, Escher expanded the middle of Metamorphosis II to include several other elements, leaving its ends (which included the Atrani-chess dyad) unchanged.

== See also ==
- Metamorphosis I
- Metamorphosis III
- Regular Division of the Plane
- Tessellation
- Chess in the arts
