= Alfonso II =

Alfonso II may refer to:

- Alfonso II of Asturias (791–842)
- Alfonso II of Aragon (1162–1196)
- Alfonso II, Count of Provence (1174–1209)
- Afonso II of Portugal (1185–1223), "the Fat"
- Alfonso, Count of Poitou (1220–1271), jure uxoris Alfonso II, Count of Toulouse
- Alfonso II, Duke of Gandia (c. 1358–1422)
- Alfonso II of Naples (1448–1495)
- Alfonso II Piccolomini (1499–1559), Neapolitan nobleman and military leader
- Alfonso II d'Este (1533–1597), duke of Ferrara
- Alfonso, Duke of Anjou and Cádiz (1972–1989), Legitimist pretender to the French throne
