= Sayagata =

East Asian tessellated pattern

The sayagata (Japanese: 紗綾形) pattern is a traditional East Asian decorative motif. It is made up of interlocking swastikas forming a tessellation of H-shaped figures.

== History ==
The pattern may have originated in Ancient India and was introduced to Japan by way of textiles imported from Ming China in the late 16th century.

In a 1964 lecture titled The Regular Division of the Plane, M. C. Escher used sayagata as an example of a space-filling design, describing it simply as "a very well known Japanese pattern". Sayagata is also featured in Escher's print series of the same name.
