= Alfonso I =

Alfonso I or Alphonso I may refer to:

- Alfonso I of Asturias (739–757), king of Asturias
- Alfonso I of Aragon (1104–1134), known as Alfonso the Battler, king of Aragon and Navarre
- Alfonso I, Duke of Gandia (1332–1412)
- Alfonso V of Aragon (1396–1458), king of Naples as Alfonso I
- Alfonso I Piccolomini (1468–1498), duke of Amalfi
- Alfonso I d'Este, Duke of Ferrara (1476–1534)

== See also ==
- Afonso I of Portugal (1094–1185), king of Portugal
- Afonso I of Kongo (1456–1543), first Christian king of the Kingdom of Kongo
- Alfonso XIII of Spain (1886–1941), known to French Legitimists as "Alphonse I"
