= Robert Wilmot (playwright) =

English playwright and cleric

Robert Wilmot (c. 1550 – by 1608) was a Church of England clergyman, known as a playwright.

== Life ==
Wilmot entered the Inner Temple by 1567. He matriculated as a sizar, at Queens' College, Cambridge, in 1572, graduating B.A. in 1577. He was ordained deacon in 1578.

On 28 November 1582 Wilmot was presented by Gabriel Poyntz to the rectory of North Ockendon, about six miles from Romford in Essex. then on 2 December 1585, by the dean and chapter of St Paul's Cathedral, to the vicarage of Horndon-on-the-Hill, a few miles away. He is described in 1585 as M.A. It does not appear when the vicarage at Horndon was vacated, but in 1608 the crown, by lapse of the patron's right, appointed to Okendon another Robert Wilmot, who died in 1619.

== Works ==
Wilmot published, in 1591, The Tragedie of Tancred and Gismund, with a plot deriving from Boccaccio's Decameron. It is dedicated by to "Lady Marie Peter and the Lady Annie Graie", the latter being the wife of Henry Grey, esq., of Pirgo. After the dedication comes a letter to the author from William Webbe; before the play there are complimentary sonnets to the Queen's maids of honour.

The play was acted, as Gismund of Salern, before Elizabeth I in 1568. In Wilmot's version the initials of five co-authors are given at the end of the five acts as follows: Rod. Staf.; Hen. No. (Henry Noel?); G. Al.; Ch. Hat. (Christopher Hatton); and R. W. (Robert Wilmot). The story is in William Painter's Palace of Pleasure, tale 39, and originally the play was in decasyllabic rhyming quatrains. Wilmot in 1591 made it into blank verse. It has dumb shows to begin and choruses to terminate the acts. The 1591 edition was reprinted in James Dodsley's Collection, vol. ii., in 1780 (4th edit. by Hazlitt, 1874, vol. vii.).

Another work by Wilmot was Syrophenisia, or the Canaanitish Woman (1598), a sermon.

== Notes ==
Attribution

This article incorporates text from a publication now in the public domain: Lee, Sidney, ed. (1900). "Wilmot, Robert (fl.1568-1608)". Dictionary of National Biography. Vol. 62. London: Smith, Elder & Co.
