= William Webbe =

William Webbe (fl. 1568–1591) was an English critic and translator. He attended Trinity College, Cambridge, and was a tutor for distinguished families, including the two sons of Edward Sulyard of Flemyngs, Essex, and later the children of Henry Grey of Pirgo, also in Essex.

Webbe wrote a Discourse of English Poetrie (1586), dedicated to Sulyard, in which he discusses prosody and reviews English poetry up to his own day. He argued that the dearth of good English poetry since Chaucer's day was not due to lack of poetic ability, or to the poverty of the language, but to the want of a proper system of prosody. He decried rhyming verse, showed enthusiasm for Spenser's The Shepheardes Calender, and urged the adoption of hexameters and sapphics for English verse

He also translated Virgil's first two Eclogues. A letter by Webbe to Robert Wilmot (fl. 1568–1608) is prepended to the 1591 edition of Wilmot's play Tragedie of Tancred and Gismund. The letter, praising Wilmot for having decided to publish the tragedy, acts as a prefacing endorsement of the play.
