= Antonio Beccadelli di Bologna =

Italian aristocrat (c.1475–1513)

Antonio Beccadelli of Bologna (c.1475-1513) was an Italian aristocrat, whose tragic love affair and secret marriage with Giovanna d'Aragona, Duchess of Amalfi, inspired several works of literature, most notably John Webster's The Duchess of Malfi and Lope de Vega's El mayordomo de la Duquesa Amalfi.

== Sources ==
Information about the life of Antonio Beccadelli is mostly derived from Matteo Bandello's account of the events. Bandello probably knew Beccadelli personally when the latter was living in Milan. Despite some elements of poetic licence (including portraying himself under the name Delio), Bandello's basic account is supported by contemporary literature such as Camillo Tutini's Chronicle, and the genealogical works of Scipione Ammirato.

== Life ==
Beccadelli was the son of Antonino Beccadelli and Giulia di Sangro, and grandson of the famous humanist Antonio Beccadelli, known as Panormita. His paternal grandfather had been inducted into the ranks of the aristocracy of Naples by Alfonso V in 1450. Despite belonging to the city aristocracy, and his impressive personal qualities, Beccadelli was not of sufficient social status to aspire to the hand of a woman of royal blood such as Giovanna d'Aragona.

Beccadelli became the estate manager of Frederick, King of Naples from 1494. When Frederick surrendered to the French (1501), Beccadelli retired to private life in Naples with an annual pension of about a thousand ducats. By 1498 he was working as the estate manager of Giovanna d'Aragona, the young widow of Alfonso I, Duke of Amalfi, who had a young son born after her husband's death. The two soon became intimately involved and were married secretly, having two children. The Duchess chose to make the marriage public in November 1510, when she travelled with a large retinue on a pilgrimage to Santa Maria of Loreto. In fact the Duchess went to Ancona to join Antonio.

When the marriage became known to Giovanna's brother, Cardinal Luigi d'Aragona he made his disapproval of the relationship sufficiently clear that the Duchess and her family chose to travel to Siena. The Duchess was captured on her way between Siena and Venice, and was imprisoned with her maid and two sons by Beccadelli in a tower to Amalfi, where they all disappeared, probably murdered, though this did not become known until many years later. Beccadelli, unaware of the fate of his wife and children, took refuge in Milan. For some time he remained under the protection of Silvio Savelli. He then entered the service of Gian Francesco Acquaviva, Marquis of Bitonto. Finally he was assassinated by three murderers sent by the Cardinal, led by Daniele Bozolo. It is unclear whether this happened in Milan or Padua.

== In literature ==
The tragic story has inspired many literary works, taking their account of events from Matteo Bandello's version. These include:

- The Palace of Pleasure, 1566, by William Painter
- The Duchess of Malfi, by John Webster
- El mayordomo de la Duquesa Amalfi by Lope de Vega
