= Metamorphosis I =

1937 woodcut print by M. C. Escher

- Artist: M. C. Escher
- Year: 1937
- Type: woodcut
- Dimensions: 19.5 cm × 90.8 cm (7.7 in × 35.7 in)

Metamorphosis I is a woodcut print by the Dutch artist M. C. Escher which was first printed in May, 1937. This piece measures 19.5 cm × 90.8 cm (7 5/8 in × 35 3/4 in) and is printed on two sheets.

The concept of this work is to morph one image into a tessellated pattern, then gradually to alter the outlines of that pattern to become an altogether different image. From left to right, the image begins with a depiction of the coastal Italian town of Atrani (see Atrani, Coast of Amalfi). The outlines of the architecture then morph to a pattern of three-dimensional blocks. These blocks then slowly become a tessellated pattern of cartoon-like figures in oriental attire.

== See also ==
- Metamorphosis II
- Metamorphosis III
- Regular Division of the Plane

== Sources ==
- Locher, J. L. (2000). The Magic of M. C. Escher. Harry N. Abrams, Inc. ISBN 0-8109-6720-0.
