= The Duchess of Malfi =

1612-1613 play by John Webster

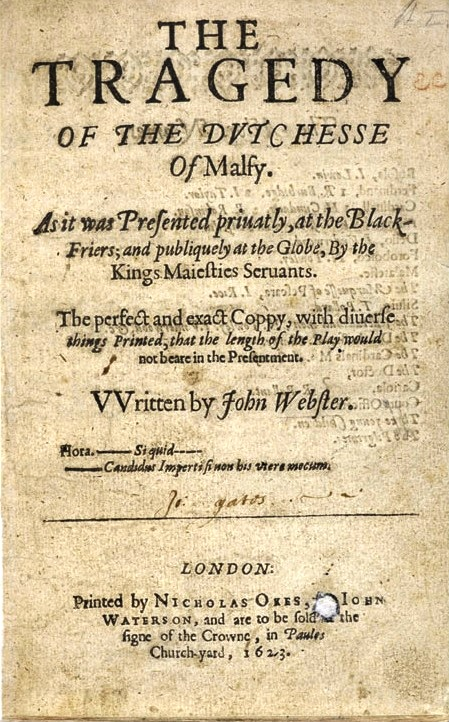
- Title page of The Duchess of Malfi
- Original language: Early Modern English
- Written by: John Webster
- Characters: Antonio Bologna; Delio; Daniel de Bosola; The Cardinal; Ferdinand; Castruchio; The Duchess of Malfi; Cariola; Julia
- Subject: corruption, cruelty, social class
- Genre: Revenge tragedy
- Setting: Malfi, Rome, Milan; 1504–10

Premiere
- Date: 1613 or 1614
- Place: Blackfriars Theatre, London

The Duchess of Malfi (originally published as The Tragedy of the Dutchesse of Malfy) is a Jacobean revenge tragedy written by English dramatist John Webster in 1612–1613. It was first performed privately at the Blackfriars Theatre, then later to a larger audience at The Globe, in 1613–1614.

Published in 1623, the play is loosely based on events that occurred between 1508 and 1513 surrounding Giovanna d'Aragona, Duchess of Amalfi (d. 1511), whose father, Enrico d'Aragona, Marquis of Gerace, was an illegitimate son of Ferdinand I of Naples. As in the play, she secretly married Antonio Beccadelli di Bologna after the death of her first husband Alfonso I Piccolomini, Duke of Amalfi.

The play begins as a love story, when the Duchess marries beneath her class, and ends as a nightmarish tragedy as her two brothers undertake their revenge, destroying themselves in the process. Jacobean drama continued the trend of stage violence and horror set by Elizabethan tragedy, under the influence of Seneca. The complexity of some of the play's characters, particularly Bosola and the Duchess, and Webster's poetic language, have led many critics to consider The Duchess of Malfi among the greatest tragedies of English renaissance drama.

== Characters ==
- The Duchess – The protagonist, sister to Ferdinand and the Cardinal. At the beginning she is a widow whose brothers take every precaution to keep her from marriage, though later she secretly marries Antonio, and for this her brothers arrange to have her strangled. She is described as having a sweet countenance and noble virtue, unlike her brothers. She is also witty and clever, helping her keep up with her brothers' banter, and has a tenderness and warmth which they lack. She has three children, two sons and a daughter by Antonio. (There is an inconsistency surrounding earlier children by her deceased husband, put down to a careless mistake by Webster.) Based on Giovanna d'Aragona, Duchess of Amalfi
- Antonio Bologna – Antonio returned from France, full of scorn for the Italian courtiers, whom he sees as more corrupt than the French. Antonio is the steward of the Duchess of Malfi's palace. His honesty and good judgment of character are traits well known to the other characters. He accepts the Duchess' proposal of marriage because of her disposition rather than her beauty. Her marrying beneath her status is a problem, however, and their marriage has to remain a secret, as Antonio shares neither her title nor her money.
- Delio – A courtier, who tries to woo Julia. Based on Matteo Bandello's self-depiction under this name, his purpose is to be the sounding board for his friend Antonio. Because he asks so many pertinent questions, he serves as a source of important information to the audience, and is privy to the secrets of Antonio's marriage and children.
- Daniel de Bosola – A former servant of the Cardinal, now returned from a sentence in the galleys for murder. Publicly rejected by his previous employer the Cardinal, he is sent by Ferdinand to spy on the Duchess as her Provisor of Horse. (Note: Equestrian steward; one who had the care of providing for her stables.) (Ferdinand hopes to keep her away from marriage.) Bosola is involved in the murder of the Duchess, her children, Cariola, Antonio, the Cardinal, Ferdinand, and a servant. Witnessing the nobility of the Duchess and Antonio facing their deaths, he finally feels guilty, and seeks to avenge them. This change of heart makes him the play's most complex character. A malcontent and cynic, he makes numerous critical comments on the nature of Renaissance society. (He is based on the historical Daniele de Bozolo, about whom little is known.)
- The Cardinal – The brother to the Duchess and Ferdinand. A corrupt, icy cardinal of the Roman Catholic Church who keeps a mistress. He has arranged a spy (Bosola) to observe his sister – all this on the quiet, however, leaving others ignorant of his plotting. Of remorse, love, loyalty, or even greed, he knows nothing, and his reasons for hating his sister are a mystery. (Historically, his name was Luigi d'Aragona.)
- Ferdinand – The Duke of Calabria and twin brother of the Duchess. Unlike his rational brother the Cardinal, Ferdinand has rages and violent outbursts disproportionate to the perceived offence. As a result of his regret for hiring Bosola to kill the Duchess, he gradually loses his sanity—he believes he is a wolf and digs up graves (lycanthropia). (In reality, his name was Carlo, Marquis of Gerace.)
- Castruchio (Castruccio) – An old lord. His name plays on the word "castrated", suggesting impotence. He is a stock character, an elderly man with a young, unfaithful wife (Julia). He is genial and easygoing, attempting to stay on good terms with all.
- Roderigo – A courtier
- Grisolan – A courtier
- Silvio – A courtier
- Pescara – A marquis, possibly Fernando d'Avalos
- Cariola – The Duchess's waiting-woman who is privy to her secrets. She witnesses the Duchess's wedding and delivers her children. She dies tragically by strangulation following the murder of the Duchess and the youngest children. Her name plays on the Italian carriolo, meaning "trundle-bed", where personal servants would have slept.
- Julia – Castruchio's wife and the Cardinal's mistress. She dies at the Cardinal's hands from a poisoned Bible.
- Malateste – A hanger-on at the Cardinal's court. The name means 'headache'. Referred to as a "mere stick of sugar candy" by the Duchess, he is yet another interchangeable courtier serving the sycophantic court.
- Doctor – Sent for to diagnose Ferdinand's madness and his supposed "lycanthropia".

There are also minor roles including courtiers, servants, officers, a mistress, the Duchess's children, executioners, etc.

== Synopsis ==
The play is set in the court of Malfi (Amalfi), Italy, from 1504 to 1510. The recently widowed Duchess falls in love with Antonio, a lowly steward. Her brothers, Ferdinand and the Cardinal, forbid her from remarrying, seeking to defend their inheritance and desperate to avoid a degrading association with a social inferior. Suspicious of her, they hire Bosola to spy on her. Over the next few years, she elopes with Antonio and bears him three children secretly. During the first pregnancy, Bosola discovers - through way of a dropped horoscope - that the Duchess is pregnant, but is unable to find out who the father is. Bosola informs the Cardinal and Ferdinand, both of whom are enraged by the news. However, both brothers decide to wait until Bosola finds out who the father is before acting and confronting the Duchess.

Years later, Ferdinand - upon being informed by Bosola that the Duchess has had two further children - confronts, threatens and disowns the Duchess in her bedchamber. In an attempt to escape, she and Antonio concoct a story that Antonio has swindled her out of her fortune and must flee into exile. The Duchess takes Bosola into her confidence, unaware that he is Ferdinand's spy, and arranges for him to deliver her jewellery to Antonio at his hiding-place in Ancona. She will join them later, while pretending to make a pilgrimage to a nearby town. The Cardinal hears of the plan from Bosola, instructing him to banish the two lovers, and sends soldiers to capture them. Antonio escapes with their eldest son, but the Duchess, her maid, and her two younger children are returned to Malfi and die at the hands of Bosola's executioners, who are under Ferdinand's orders. This experience leads Bosola to turn against the brothers, and he decides to take up the cause of "revenge for the Duchess of Malfi" (5.2). Overcome by apparent guilt for the murders, Ferdinand dissolves into madness and is diagnosed with lycanthropia.

The Cardinal confesses his part in the killing of the Duchess to his mistress, Julia, then murders her with a poisoned Bible after she can't promise to keep his confession a secret. Bosola overhears the Cardinal plotting to kill him from a hiding place, so he visits the darkened chapel to kill the Cardinal at his prayers. Instead, he mistakenly kills Antonio, who has just returned to Malfi to attempt a reconciliation with the Cardinal. The Cardinal and Ferdinand then enter; in the brawl which follows, Bosola manages to wound the Cardinal, and a maddened Ferdinand stabs both of them before being killed by Bosola. The Cardinal and Bosola die from their injuries as the surviving characters arrive on the scene.

Antonio's elder son by the Duchess appears in the final scene and takes his place as the heir to the Malfi fortune. The son's decision is in spite of his father's explicit wish that he "fly the court of princes", a corrupt and increasingly deadly environment.

The conclusion is controversial for some readers because they find reason to believe the inheriting son is not the rightful heir of the Duchess. The play briefly mentions a son who is the product of her first marriage and would therefore have a stronger claim to the duchy. Other scholars believe the mention of a prior son is just a careless error in the text.

== Plot ==
=== Act 1 ===
- Scene 1—The Duchess's palace in Malfi: Antonio and Delio are discussing the former's return from France, and discussing how the French king runs his court, comparing it to an easily poisoned fountain. They are interrupted by the entry of Bosola and the Cardinal. Antonio and Delio hold their conversation, stepping to the background to watch as Bosola angrily tries to gain the Cardinal's pardon, speaking of the time he has spent in the galleys in penal servitude, and in the service of the Cardinal. Bosola declares that he is surely done with service, but the Cardinal is not interested in Bosola's new merit and takes his leave. Bosola compares himself to Tantalus, never able to acquire the thing he most desires, like an injured soldier who can only depend on his crutches for support of any kind. When he leaves, Antonio and Delio comment on his past offence, and how he will surely come to no good if he is kept in neglect. Ferdinand comes into the palace, talking to his courtiers about a tournament that Antonio has just won. When the Cardinal, Duchess, and Cariola enter to speak with Ferdinand, Antonio and Delio have a moment to themselves to discuss the Cardinal's character; he is found to be a very dishonest, disagreeable person, as is his brother, Ferdinand. Only their sister, the Duchess, earns the approval of everyone, a very pleasant and gracious woman. After the two gentlemen leave, Ferdinand petitions his sister to make Bosola the manager of her horses; when everyone else leaves, Ferdinand and the Cardinal reveal that it is because Bosola is to spy on their sister. When Bosola is brought in and made aware of this plan, he at first refuses, but ultimately is given no choice. The Cardinal and Ferdinand then turn their attention to their sister, urging her not to marry again, now that she is a widow, going so far as to threaten her with death, in Ferdinand's case. She refuses to be bullied, and once her brothers are out of sight, she proposes to Antonio by giving him her wedding ring. Having Cariola, the Duchess's maid, as their witness, this private ceremony is legally binding and the Duchess and Antonio become husband and wife.

=== Act 2 ===
- Scene 1—The Duchess's palace in Malfi, nine months later: Bosola and Castruchio enter, Bosola criticising his companion's appearance, and telling him that he would make a ridiculous judge. When an old woman intrudes on their conversation, Bosola's insults turn on her, calling her hideous to the point that no amount of make-up would help. He also accuses her of being too like a witch; the old lady and Castruchio leave Bosola alone to muse on the mysterious way the Duchess is acting of late. He believes she is pregnant (no one but Delio and Cariola know that the Duchess and Antonio are married), and aims to prove it by using apricots both to spark her pregnant appetite and to induce labour, as apricots were believed to do. The Duchess, when she enters, accepts the fruit from Bosola, and quickly starts going into labour. She then retires to her chamber claiming to be ill, with a worried Antonio following in her wake.
- Scene 2—Same place and time as the previous scene: Bosola, alone, realises that the Duchess is indeed pregnant. After accosting the hapless old lady again, he watches as Antonio and the servants in a commotion about a Swiss mercenary who had invaded the Duchess's room, and the loss of several jewels and gold utensils. Even with all the uproar, Antonio is not distracted from his wife's "illness"; she is actually in labour. Cariola, the lady's maid, enters with good news once Antonio is alone—he is the father of a son.
- Scene 3—Same place and time as the previous scene: Bosola re-enters the now empty room, having heard a woman (the Duchess) shriek. Antonio discovers him and questions his purpose in being there, since everyone had been commanded to keep to their rooms. Antonio tells him to stay away from the Duchess since he doesn't trust Bosola. In Antonio's agitation, he accidentally drops a horoscope for his son's birth, which Bosola retrieves. He realises what it means, and resolves to send it to the Duchess's brothers with Castruccio.
- Scene 4—The Cardinal's rooms: The Cardinal and his mistress, Julia, are discussing their rendezvous when a messenger calls the Cardinal away with an important message. Delio enters to find Julia alone. He was once a suitor of hers and offers her money. Julia leaves to meet her husband, Castruccio, and Delio fears that her husband's arrival means Antonio's secret marriage is about to be revealed.
- Scene 5—Rome, in Ferdinand's private apartments: An enraged Ferdinand, with the letter from Bosola, and his brother the Cardinal, meet to discuss what they think is an awful treachery by their sister. Ferdinand is angry to the point of shouting about his sister's "whorish" behaviour (he knows of the child, but not of the marriage), and the Cardinal struggles to control his brother's temperamental outburst. Ferdinand resolves to discover the man his sister is seeing, threatening all and sundry.

=== Act 3 ===
- Scene 1—The Duchess's palace in Malfi, after some time has passed: Antonio greets the returning Delio, who has come from Rome with Ferdinand. Antonio reveals that the Duchess has had two more children in the time Delio was gone. Antonio fears the wrath of the recently arrived Ferdinand, and Delio tells him the ordinary people think the Duchess is a whore. While they talk, the Duchess and Ferdinand enter. He tells her that he has found a husband for her, the Count Malateste. She disregards this, as she is already married (still secretly of course) to Antonio. When left alone, Ferdinand consults with Bosola to discover the father of the three seemingly illegitimate children; Bosola has acquired a skeleton key to the Duchess's room, which Ferdinand takes, telling him to guess what will happen next.
- Scene 2—The Duchess's bedchamber: Antonio comes up to the Duchess's bedroom to spend the night, and they banter back and forth about the point of lovers just sleeping together. Antonio and Cariola leave to allow the Duchess to complete her night-time preparations, but she is not alone; Ferdinand sneaks in and startles her. He gives her a knife, intending her to kill herself, and his fury increases when she tells him she is married without his knowledge. Ferdinand leaves, declaring he will never see her again. He exits just in time, for Antonio bursts in brandishing a pistol, but the Duchess forces him to leave again when Bosola knocks at the door. Bosola informs the Duchess that Ferdinand has left for Rome again, and she tells him that Ferdinand's bills of exchange (he has so far dealt with her accounts) will no longer work, since Antonio has been false with her accounts. This is, of course, a trick to get Antonio out of Malfi; she calls Antonio back in (once Bosola exits) to tell him to flee to Ancona, where she will send him all her treasure and valuables. The couple puts on a show argument for the benefit of the returning Bosola and officers, where she criticises his faulty record keeping and banishes him. Bosola does not believe the Duchess was justified in banishing Antonio, and tells her that Antonio is a good, honest man. This speech prompts the Duchess to confide the secret marriage to Bosola. He is then left on stage to lament his role as a spy, for now he must reveal all to Ferdinand.
- Scene 3—A room in a palace at Rome: The Cardinal, Ferdinand, Malateste, Pescara, Silvio and Delio are discussing the new fortifications that are being made in Naples. Ferdinand and his men, leaving the Cardinal and Malateste to speak privately, are very harsh in their critique of Malateste, considering him too cowardly to fight in an upcoming battle. Bosola, meanwhile, interrupts the Cardinal's private conference with news of his sister. The Cardinal leaves to petition for her and her family's exile from Ancona, while Bosola goes to tell the Duchess's first child (from her first husband) what has happened with his mother. Ferdinand goes to find Antonio.
- Scene 4—The shrine of Our Lady of Loreto, Italy, in the Ancona province: Two pilgrims are visiting the shrine in Ancona, and witness the Cardinal being symbolically prepared for war. The Cardinal then proceeds to take the Duchess's wedding ring, banish her, Antonio, and their children, while the pilgrims muse over the reason for what they have just seen.
- Scene 5—Near Loreto: The newly banished family, and the maid Cariola, enter Loreto. Shortly after their arrival, Bosola comes and presents the Duchess with a letter from Ferdinand, which indirectly states that Ferdinand wants Antonio dead. Antonio tells Bosola that he will not go to Ferdinand, and the Duchess urges him to take the oldest child and go to Milan to find safety, which he promptly does. Bosola and masked guards then take the Duchess and her remaining children captive, on the orders of her brothers.

=== Act 4 ===
- Scene 1—A prison (or the Duchess's lodgings serving as a prison) near Loreto: Ferdinand comes in with Bosola, who is describing to him how the Duchess is dealing with her imprisonment. It seems she is not affected to Ferdinand's satisfaction, and he leaves angrily. Bosola greets the Duchess, telling her that her brother wishes to speak with her, but will not do so where he can see her. She agrees to meet with her brother in the darkness. Once the lights are out, Ferdinand returns. He presents her with a dead man's hand, leading her to believe that it is Antonio's, with her wedding ring on it. He then exits, leaving Bosola to show the Duchess lifelike figures of her husband and children, made to appear as though her family was dead. The Duchess believes them to be the genuine articles, and resolves to die—her despair is so deep it affects Bosola. When she leaves, Ferdinand re-enters; Bosola pleads with him to send his sister to a convent, refusing to be a part of the plot any more. Ferdinand is beyond reason at this point, and tells Bosola to go to Milan to find the real Antonio.
- Scene 2—Same place and time as the previous scene: The Duchess and her maid, Cariola, come back, distracted by the noises being made by a group of madmen (Ferdinand brought them in to terrorise her). A servant tells her that they were brought for sport, and lets in several of the madmen. Bosola, too, sneaks in with them, disguised as an old man, and tells the Duchess that he is there to make her tomb. When she tries to pull rank on him, executioners with cords and a coffin come in. Cariola is removed from the room, leaving Bosola and the executioners with the Duchess. The Duchess makes a brave show, telling the executioners to "pull, and pull strongly", welcoming her strangulation. Cariola is brought back, and after struggling fiercely, she too is strangled. Ferdinand comes to view the scene, and is also shown the bodies of his sister's children, who were murdered as well. Ferdinand reveals that he and the Duchess were twins, and that he had hoped, if she had remained a widow, to inherit all her wealth. Bosola, sensing that Ferdinand is ready to turn on him next, demands payment for his atrocities. Ferdinand, distracted, leaves him alone with the bodies. Astonishingly, the Duchess is not dead. A shocked Bosola has no time to call for medicine; he manages to tell the Duchess that Antonio is not really dead; that the figures she saw were fake, before she finally dies. Bosola, remorseful at last, takes her body to the care of some good women, planning to leave immediately thereafter for Milan.

=== Act 5 ===
- Scene 1—Outside Ferdinand and the Cardinal's palace in Milan: Antonio returns to see if he can reconcile with Ferdinand and the Cardinal, but Delio is dubious as to the wisdom of this. Delio asks Pescara, a marquis, to give him possession of Antonio's estate for safekeeping, but Pescara denies him. Julia presents Pescara with a letter from the Cardinal, which states that she should receive Antonio's property, and which Pescara grants to her. When Delio confronts him about this, Pescara says that he would not give an innocent man a property that was taken from someone by such vile means (the Cardinal took the property for himself once Antonio was banished), for it will now become an appropriate place for the Cardinal's mistress. This statement impresses the hidden Antonio. When Pescara leaves to visit an ill Ferdinand, Antonio decides to pay a night-time visit to the Cardinal.
- Scene 2—Inside the same palace: Pescara, come to visit Ferdinand, is discussing his condition with the doctor, who believes Ferdinand may have lycanthropia: a condition whereby he believes he is a wolf. The doctor thinks there is a chance of a relapse, in which case Ferdinand's diseased behaviour would return; namely, digging up dead bodies at night. Pescara and the doctor make way for the mad Ferdinand, who attacks his own shadow. The Cardinal, who has entered with Ferdinand, manages to catch Bosola, who has been watching Ferdinand's ravings. The Cardinal assigns Bosola to seek out Antonio (by following Delio) and then slay him. After the Cardinal leaves, Bosola does not even make it to the door before he is stopped by Julia, who is brandishing a pistol. She accuses him of having given her a love potion, and threatens to kill him to end her love. Bosola manages to disarm her and convince her to gather intelligence for him about the Cardinal. Bosola then hides while Julia uses all of her persuasive powers to get the Cardinal to reveal his part in the death of his sister and her children. The Cardinal then makes Julia swear to keep silent, forcing her to kiss the poisoned cover of a bible, causing her to die almost instantly. Bosola comes out of hiding to confront the Cardinal, although he declares that he still intends to kill Antonio. Giving him a master key, the Cardinal takes his leave. However, once he is alone, Bosola swears to protect Antonio, and goes off to bury Julia's body.
- Scene 3—A courtyard outside the same palace: Delio and Antonio are near the Duchess's tomb; as they talk, an echo from the tomb mirrors their conversation. Delio leaves to find Antonio's eldest son, and Antonio leaves to escape the distressing echo of his wife's resting place.
- Scene 4—The Cardinal's apartments in Milan: The Cardinal enters, trying to dissuade Pescara, Malateste, Roderigo and Grisolan from staying to keep watch over Ferdinand. He goes so far as to say that he might feign mad fits to test their obedience; if they come to help, they will be in trouble. They unwillingly exit, and Bosola enters to find the Cardinal planning to have him killed. Antonio, unaware of Bosola, sneaks in while it is dark, planning to seek audience with the Cardinal. Not realising who has entered, Bosola attacks Antonio; he is horrified to see his mistake. He manages to relate the death of the Duchess and children to the dying Antonio, who is glad to be dying in sadness, now that life is pointless for him. Bosola then leaves to bring down the Cardinal.
- Scene 5—The same apartments, near Julia's lodging: The Cardinal, unaware of what has just happened, is reading a book when Bosola enters with a servant, who is bearing Antonio's body. He threatens the Cardinal, who calls for help. Help is not forthcoming, for the gentlemen from the beginning of the previous scene, while they can hear him calling, have no desire to go to his aid (because of his previous order to not at any cost try to help Ferdinand). Bosola kills the servant of the Cardinal first, and then attacks The Cardinal and stabs him in the chest. Ferdinand bursts in to attack Bosola; in his madness, he stabs both Bosola and the Cardinal before Bosola kills him with a wound to the heart. As Bosola and The Cardinal prepare to finish each other off, they both collapse, dead. Delio arrives on the scene with Antonio's surviving son and, upon seeing the bodies, declares that Antonio's son will now take his rightful place as heir to the Malfi fortune.

== Sources ==
Webster's principal source was in William Painter's The Palace of Pleasure (1567), which was a translation of François de Belleforest's French adaptation of Matteo Bandello's Novelle (1554). Bandello had known Antonio Beccadelli di Bologna in Milan before his assassination. He recounted the story of Antonio's secret marriage to Giovanna after the death of her first husband, stating that it brought down the wrath of her two brothers, one of whom, Luigi d'Aragona, was a powerful cardinal under Pope Julius II. Bandello says that the brothers arranged the kidnapping of the Duchess, her maid, and two of her three children by Antonio, all of whom were then murdered. Antonio, unaware of their fate, escaped to Milan with his oldest son, where he was later assassinated by a gang led by one Daniele Bozzolo.

Webster's play follows this story fairly faithfully, but departs from the source material by depicting Bozzolo as a conflicted figure who repents, kills Antonio by mistake, then turns on the brothers killing them both. In fact the brothers were never accused of the crime in their lifetimes and died of natural causes.

== Main themes ==
=== Corruption ===
In the Duchess of Malfi, the concepts of corruption and integrity are constantly expressed throughout the play. Some examples of corruption are, a) the Cardinal and Ferdinand who represent political and religious powers. The Cardinal who is part of a religious institution maintains a relationship with Julia, a married woman, b) Ferdinand and the Cardinal both use their social status for their individual benefits, c) Bosola’s ambition engaging in questionable acts for social advancement . In contrast, the Duchess maintaining her values until her death reflects her integrity.

A vein of corruption runs throughout the play, notably in the character of the deadly Cardinal, a man ready to employ lesser beings (such as Bosola) to commit murders for him, then cast them aside as rotten fruit. He is no stranger to murder himself, however, as he slays his own mistress by making her kiss a poisoned bible. Antonio describes him thus:

The spring in his face is nothing but the engend'ring of toads; where he is jealous of any man, he lays worse plot for them than ever was impos'd on Hercules, for he strews in his way flatterers, panders, intelligencers, atheists, and a thousand such political monsters. He should have been Pope; but instead of coming to it by the primitive decency of the church, he did bestow bribes so largely and so impudently as if he would have carried it away without heaven's knowledge. Some good he hath done.

The Cardinal gambles, keeps the wife of one of his courtiers as a mistress, and fights duels. Conspiracy and intrigue are the air he breathes. Duke Ferdinand is his brother's willing conspirator in villainy, and at times his rages shock even the Cardinal's sense of decorum. The Duke's corruption in the end destroys his sanity: incestuous desire for his own sister. Realizing she has married and borne children by Antonio, his rage drives him to do everything in his power to bring his sister to despair, madness and death, but in the end he is driven mad himself.

These two perverse villains destroy or poison all that is within their reach, all semblance of warmth or human affection.

=== Abuse of power ===
Ferdinand and the Cardinal engage in abuse of power by controlling the Duchess’s decisions to maintain their authority, leading to her persecution and murder.

The brothers repeatedly abuse their power. Ferdinand is caught committing adultery but is not punished. The Cardinal abuses his ecclesiastical powers to have Antonio's property confiscated and to have the Duchess and her family banished from the state of Ancona. Ferdinand and the Cardinal order the death of the Duchess without any proper judgement passed by a court of law.

=== Status of women and responsibility for the tragedy ===
Regarding the status of women, some authors have discussed the incompatible and multiple roles performed by the Duchess. These roles could be distinguished as public or private with specific functions. For instance, sister, widow, ruler of Malfi, wife, friend, and mother. Most of these roles are judged by a patriarchal society which makes more challenging, rigid, and impossible to accomplish. At the beginning of the play, the Duchess interacts with her brothers in a more passive role.

The Duchess challenges the misogynistic perspective by selecting her sexual partner, having her own ideas such as challenging ageing, maintaining her privacy, and having decisions over her body, for example, becoming pregnant. It has also been discussed Bosola’s envy functioning as a catalyst factor to end the play in a tragedy.

The brothers demand that the Duchess be submissive to their (patriarchal) control, although widowhood was often the first time women might be independent of the control of husbands or male relatives. The Duchess's assertion of her freedom of choice is well illustrated in an aside following a conversation with her brothers in which they strictly forbid her to remarry. Immediately her brothers exit, she says to herself: "If all my royal kindred / Lay in my way unto this marriage, / I'd make them my low foot-steps." The central conflict of the play involves the Duchess's desire to marry for love and her brothers' desire to prevent her from remarrying (apparently in order to inherit her estate, but in Ferdinand's case perhaps also out of an underlying incestuous jealousy). Throughout, she refuses to submit to her brothers' attempts to control her and asserts her identity and self-control even at her death, announcing "I am Duchess of Malfi still" (4.2).

The internal struggle faced by the Duchess when fighting her brothers and hiding her marriage reflects the influence on Webster of Roman paradigms as represented in Senecan tragedies.

=== Cruelty ===
The relationship between the Duchess and her brothers is rooted in cruelty. The brothers often try to manipulate her and drive her mad. This cruelty is first evident when the Cardinal and Ferdinand lock the Duchess in her own home. Ferdinand deceives the Duchess into thinking that he cares: "I come to seal my peace with you. / Here's a hand, / To which you have vowed much love. / The ring upon't / You gave"(4.1 42–44). In the darkness, the Duchess thinks that Ferdinand is asking for her forgiveness when he reaches out his hand, and so she kisses it; when the lights come on she sees the dead bodies of her husband and children, and believes she just kissed her husband's severed hand. But in reality, Ferdinand used wax figures to trick her into thinking her family is dead. This deception and cruelty cause the Duchess physical and emotional torment throughout the play. At the end of the play, the Duchess is strangled at the request of her brothers.

=== Class ===
The Duchess argues that high class is not an indicator of a good man. Though the Duchess and her brothers are aware of this, her brothers, concerned with wealth and honour, nevertheless strive to dismantle her marriage to Antonio while disapproving of their sister's love life. Ferdinand is particularly obsessed with the idea of inheriting the fortune to which his sister is entitled, because it would protect his social and financial status. Ultimately the Duchess is put to death for remarrying into a lower class.

Class might also be represented by the dualistic approach of rational vs. animalistic mind. Particular characteristics associated with these concepts are a subtle signs to differentiate the characters.

Bosola is also a representation of class. He betrays both the Duchess and Ferdinand due to his envy and desire of social mobility. It has also been discussed how this character has issues with hierarchical relations.

=== Objectification ===
Some authors have discussed the multiple dialogues representing the violent appropriation of the female body in which characters refer to her body as a container of blood, a complement, and visual stimulus. These reification (Marxism) of the Duchess’s body are evident and consistent with most of the male characters of the play.

The Duchess is often criticised (Clifford Leech condemned her for her 'irresponsible overturning of a social code') for stepping out of the societal expectations of a widow in sixteenth century England. As a widow, the Duchess gains a new power and independence, which angers her brothers. As a female in a position of power, she is expected to hold the throne and obey the patriarchal figures in the court, specifically her two brothers, the Cardinal and Ferdinand. The Cardinal and Ferdinand are in line to receive the inheritance if the Duchess does not have any children, so controlling her sexual affairs becomes their singular focus. Rather than respecting her autonomy and wishes, they aim to control her sexuality and diminish her independence. In Act I, Scene I, Ferdinand makes this clear when he states, "Nay, / I mean the tongue: variety of courtship. / What cannot a neat knave with a smooth tale / Make a woman believe? Farewell, lusty widow" (1.1.247–250). He is solely focused on preserving her chastity, so he views her as an object, rather than a human being. The continued objectification of the Duchess from her brothers conveys males' perceived ability to control a woman's body in the society of the 16th century.

== Theatrical devices ==
The play makes use of various theatrical devices, some of them derived from Senecan Tragedy which includes violence and bloodshed on the stage. Act III, Scene IV is a mime scene, in which a song is sung in honour of the Cardinal, who gives up his robes and invests himself with the attire of a soldier, and then performs the act of banishing the Duchess. The whole scene is commented upon by two pilgrims, who condemn the harsh behaviour of the Cardinal towards the Duchess. That the scene is set against the backdrop of the Shrine of Our Lady of Loretto, a religious place, adds to its sharp distinction between good and evil, justice and injustice.

Act V, Scene iii, features an important theatrical device, echo, which seems to emanate from the grave of the Duchess, in her voice. In its totality, it reads: "Deadly accent. A thing of sorrow. That suits it best. Ay, wife's voice. Be mindful of thy safety. O fly your fate. Thou art a dead thing. Never see her more." The echo repeats the last words of what Antonio and Delio speak, but is selective. It adds to the sense of the inevitability of Antonio's death, while highlighting the role of fate.

== Historical staging ==
Set and props: As this play would have first been produced in the Globe, the set would probably been a bare stage with movable set pieces such as tables, stools, beds, hangings, and altars, all of which would have been stock pieces used in every show. Props would also have been minimal, with essentials like swords, pistols, and candles, and dummies. The traveller and future translator of Castiglione's Cortegiano, Thomas Hoby, together with his friend Peter Whitehorne, translator of Machiavelli's Art of War, were lavishly entertained by a subsequent Duchess of Malfi and her son, Innico, in the Castello di Amalfi in 1550. Hoby was clearly very impressed by the decor, by implication superior to what he was used to in England, describing the chamber in which they were accommodated as: 'hanged with clothe of gold and vellett, wherein were two beddes, th'one of silver worke and the other of vellett, with pillowes bolsters and the shetes curiouslie wrowght with needle worke.'

Lighting: Lighting for a theatre like the Globe is completely dependent upon the sun. Performances would occur in the afternoon so as to see the performers, since no other sources of lighting were accessible. However, indoor playhouses would have been lit with candles.

Costumes: This was the Jacobean era, and Renaissance clothing, often hand-me-downs from noble patrons, would have been appropriate during this time. Especially since this play takes place among wealthy, prestigious characters who belong to The Royal Court, there would have been long dresses with elaborate sleeves and headpieces for most female characters, and doublets for most of the men as a general rule. Men would wear hose and codpieces, very royal members of The Court might wear doublets and jerkins and both men and women would be able to wear clothing with some type of colour to it. Due to the sumptuary laws, deep purple was restricted to the nobility of the times. During this period, and until the Restoration (1660) women were not generally accepted on stage. Because of this, the roles of women were played by apprentice boys or the younger men. Padding would be built into their costumes, their heads would be adorned with wigs, and extra make-up would be applied to their faces.

== The 1623 quarto ==
The Duchess of Malfi was first performed between 1613 and 1614 by the King's Men, an acting group to which Shakespeare belonged. The printer was Nicholas Okes and the publisher was John Waterson. However, the play was not printed in quarto (a smaller, less expensive edition than the larger folio) until 1623. The title page of this particular edition tells us that the play was printed privately. The title page also informs readers that the play text includes numerous passages that were cut for performance. The 1623 quarto is the only substantive version of the play in circulation today, and modern editions and productions are based on it. Notable is that, on the title page of the 1623 quarto, a clear distinction is drawn between the play in performance and the play as a text to be read.

== Reception and performance history ==
The play was written for and performed by the King's Men in 1613 or 1614. The double cast lists included in the 1623 quarto suggest a revival around 1619. Contemporary reference also indicated that the play was performed in 1618, for in that year Orazio Busino, the chaplain to the Venetian ambassador to England, complained of the play's treatment of Catholics in the character of the Cardinal.

The quarto's cast list allows more precision about casting than is usually available. Richard Burbage and Joseph Taylor successively played Ferdinand to Henry Condell's Cardinal. John Lowin played Bosola; William Ostler was Antonio. Boy player Richard Sharpe played the title role not in the original 1612 production, presumably due to his age, but in the revival of 1619–23. Nicholas Tooley played Forobosco, and Robert Pallant doubled numerous minor roles, including Cariola.

The quarto title page announces that the play was performed at both the Globe Theatre and at Blackfriars; however, in tone and in some details of staging (particularly the use of special lighting effects) the play is clearly meant primarily for the indoor stage. Robert Johnson, a regular composer for Blackfriars, wrote incidental music for the play and composed a setting for the "madmen's song" in Act 4.

The play is known to have been performed for Charles I at the Cockpit-in-Court in 1630; there is little reason to doubt that it was performed intermittently throughout the period.

The play remained current through the first part of the Restoration. Samuel Pepys reports seeing the play several times; it was performed by the Duke of York's company under Thomas Betterton.

By the early eighteenth century, Webster's violence and sexual frankness had gone out of taste. In 1733, Lewis Theobald wrote and directed an adaptation, The Fatal Secret; the play imposed neoclassical unities on the play, for instance by eliminating the Duchess's child and preserving the Duchess at the end. By mid-century, the play had fallen, with Webster, out of the repertory, where it stayed until the Romantic revival of Charles Lamb and William Hazlitt. In 1850, after a generation of critical interest and theatrical neglect, the play was staged by Samuel Phelps at Sadler's Wells, with Isabella Glyn in the title role. The text was adapted by Richard Henry Horne. The production was favourably reviewed by The Athenaeum; George Henry Lewes, however, registered disapproval of the play's violence and what he termed its shoddy construction: "Instead of 'holding the mirror up to nature,' this drama holds the mirror up to Madame Tussauds." These would become the cornerstones of criticisms of Webster for the next century. Still, the play was popular enough for Glyn to revive her performance periodically for the next two decades.

Shortly after, Duchess came to the United States. Working with Horne's text, director James Stark staged a production in San Francisco; this version is noteworthy for a sentimental apotheosis Stark added, in which the Duchess and Ferdinand are reunited in heaven. The most popular American productions, however, were produced by Wilmarth Waller and his wife Emma.

William Poel staged the play at the Opera Comique in 1892, with Mary Rorke as the Duchess and Murray Carson as Bosola. Poel's playscript followed Webster's text closely apart from scene rearrangements; however, reaction had set in, and the production received generally scathing reviews. William Archer, England's chief proponent of Ibsen's new drama, took advantage of the occasion to lambast what he saw as the overestimation of Elizabethan theatre in general.

In 1919, the Phoenix Society revived the play in London for the first time in two decades. The production featured Cathleen Nesbitt as the Duchess; Robert Farquharson played Ferdinand. The production was widely disparaged. For many of the newspaper critics, the failure indicated that Webster had become a "curio"; T. S. Eliot, conversely, argued that the production had failed to uncover the elements that made Webster a great dramatist—specifically his poetry. A 1935 production at the Embassy Theatre received similarly negative reviews; Ivor Brown noted that the audience left "rather with superior smiles than with emotional surrender." In 1938, a production was broadcast on BBC television; it was no better received than the previous two stage productions.

In 1937, it was performed in Dublin, Ireland, at the Abbey Theatre, with incidental music composed by Arthur Duff.

In the aftermath of World War II, George Rylands directed a production at the Haymarket Theatre that at last caught the public mood. John Gielgud, as Ferdinand, accentuated the element of incestuous passion in that character's treatment of the Duchess (played by Peggy Ashcroft). Cecil Trouncer was Bosola. Edmund Wilson was perhaps the first to note that the play struck an audience differently in the wake of the revelation of the Holocaust; this note is, from 1945 on, continually struck in discussions of the appropriateness of Webster for the modern age. A 1946 production on Broadway did not fare as well; Rylands attempted to duplicate his London staging with John Carradine as Ferdinand and Elisabeth Bergner as the Duchess. W. H. Auden adapted Webster's text for the modern audience. However, the production's most notable innovation was in the character of Bosola, which was played by Canada Lee in whiteface. The production received savage reviews from the popular press, and it fared little better in the literary reviews.

The first successful postwar performance in America was staged at the off-Broadway Phoenix Theatre in 1957. Directed by Jack Landau, who had earlier staged a brief but well-reviewed White Devil, the production emphasised (and succeeded as) Grand Guignol. As Walter Kerr put it, "Blood runs right over the footlights, spreads slowly up the aisle and spills well out into Second Avenue."

Ashcroft returned as the Duchess in a 1960 production at the Aldwych Theatre. The play was directed by Donald McWhinnie; Eric Porter played Ferdinand and Max Adrian the Cardinal. Patrick Wymark played Bosola. The production received generally favourable but lukewarm reviews. In 1971, Clifford Williams directed the play for the Royal Shakespeare Company. Judi Dench took the title role, with Geoffrey Hutchings as Bosola and Emrys James as the Cardinal. Dench's husband Michael Williams played Ferdinand, casting which highlighted the sexual element of the play's siblings.

In 1980, Adrian Noble directed the play at the Royal Exchange Theatre, Manchester. This production received excellent notices; it was transferred to London, where it won the London Drama Critic's Award for best play. Helen Mirren played the title role; Mike Gwilym played Ferdinand, and Bob Hoskins played Bosola. Pete Postlethwaite was Antonio. Mirren's performance received special acclaim.

The actor-centred troupe led by Ian McKellen and Edward Petherbridge chose Webster's play as one of their first productions. The production opened in January 1986 in the Lyttelton Theatre of the Royal National Theatre and was directed and designed by Philip Prowse. The staging was highly stylised, the scenic backdrop segmented, and the actors' movements tightly controlled. The result, as Jarka Burian noted, was "a unified, consistent mise-en-scene...without enough inner turbulence to create a completely satisfying theatre experience." Eleanor Bron played the Duchess; McKellen played Bosola, Jonathan Hyde Ferdinand, and Petherbridge the Cardinal.

In 1995, Juliet Stevenson and Simon Russell-Beale played the Duchess and Ferdinand respectively in a production at Greenwich Theatre, directed by Philip Franks.

In 2010, the production was staged for Stage on Screen at the Greenwich Theatre, London. It was directed by Elizabeth Freestone and starred Aislin McGuckin in a production that set the play in the first half of the twentieth century. In The Guardian, the reviewer noted that 'Much of the pleasure of this revival lies in re-encountering Webster's language...full of savage poetry.' The production is now available on DVD.

In July 2010, English National Opera and Punchdrunk collaborated to stage the production, which had been commissioned by the ENO from composer Torsten Rasch. The production was staged in a promenade style and performed at a mysterious vacant site at Great Eastern Quay in London's Royal Albert Basin.

From March to June 2012, London's Old Vic Theatre staged a production, directed by Jamie Lloyd and starring, amongst others, Eve Best.

In January 2014, Shakespeare's Globe staged a production directed by Dominic Dromgoole and starring Gemma Arterton as the Duchess, James Garnon as the Cardinal, David Dawson as Ferdinand, Alex Waldmann as Antonio, and Sean Gilder as Bosola. It was the first production performed in the Globe's Sam Wanamaker Playhouse. The production was filmed and broadcast on BBC4 on 25 May 2014. This production coincided with a representation of the aforementioned Theobald text of 1736 as part of the Globe's Read Not Dead series – directed by David Oakes.

In 2018, a production was staged in Stratford-upon-Avon by the Royal Shakespeare Company.

In 2024, Shakespeare's Globe staged a production at the Sam Wanamaker Playhouse, with Francesca Mills as the Duchess. This production was a part of the Sam Wanamaker Playhouse 10th Anniversary collection, the 2014 production opening the theatre 10 years prior.

Also in 2024 a production starring Jodie Whittaker and directed by Zinnie Harris ran from 5 October to 20 December at the Trafalgar Theatre; it was not very well critically received, with reviews suggesting that powerful performances by the cast were spoiled by a contrived production.

== Media adaptations ==
- Opera – Stephen Oliver's The Duchess of Malfi, staged at Oxford in 1971.
- Opera – Stephen Douglas Burton's The Duchess of Malfi, completed in 1978
- Television – In 1972, produced by the BBC
- Television – A Question of Happiness #1: A Question About Hell, an adaptation by Kingsley Amis in which the names of all the characters are changed
- Audio – In 1980, produced by the BBC.
- Radio – on BBC Third Programme, 16 May 1954, with Peggy Ashcroft as the Duchess and Paul Scofield as Ferdinand.
- Radio – In 1988 on Australia's ABC, with Fay Kelton as the Duchess.
- Radio – on BBC Radio 3, 8/11/1992, with Fiona Shaw in the title role, Roger Allam and John Shrapnel.
- Radio – on BBC Radio 3, 12/10/2008, with Sophie Okonedo as the Duchess.
- Radio – on BBC Radio 3, 11/07/2021, with Pippa Nixon as the Duchess.
- Recording – (excerpts only) In 1952, read by Dylan Thomas by Caedmon
- Recording – (full dramatisation) In 1969 by Caedmon starring Barbara Jefford as the Duchess, Alec McCowen as Ferdinand, Robert Stephens as Bosola and Jeremy Brett as Antonio.
- DVD – 2010, Stage on Screen, with Aislin McGuckin (Duchess), Tim Treloar (Bosola), Tim Steed (Ferdinand) and Mike Hadfield (Cardinal).
- Television – 2014. BBC, starring Gemma Arterton, David P. Dawson, James Garnon, Sean Gilder, Alex Waldmann, Denise Gough.
- Film – Upcoming film will stars Morfydd Clark and Sam Riley

== In popular culture ==
- Sleeping Murder by Agatha Christie (Williams, Collins Sons & Co Ltd. 1976) uses the lines Cover her face; mine eyes dazzle; she died young as the novel's central refrain.
- A fragment of Scene 2, Act 4 of the play, with Struan Rodger as Ferdinand and Donald Burton as Bosola, is shown in the 1987 BBC TV film version of Agatha Christie's detective novel Sleeping Murder.
- Cover Her Face by P. D. James (initial copyright 1962) uses the first part of the quote as the title and as a comment made by the first witness on the scene of a young murdered woman.
- The Skull Beneath the Skin by P. D. James centres around an aging actress who plans to perform The Duchess of Malfi in a Victorian castle theatre. The novel takes its title from T. S. Eliot's famous characterisation of Webster's work in his poem 'Whispers of Immortality'.
- In the culmination of John le Carré's Call for the Dead, Smiley is reported to have been quoting from The Duchess of Malfi in his delirium – "I bade thee when I was distracted of my wits go kill my dearest friend, and thou hast done it", according to Peter Guillam.
- Queen of the Damned by Anne Rice uses the lines Cover her face. Mine eyes dazzle. She died young, as a quote from Lestat to his vampire child, Claudia.
- Stephen Fry's novel The Stars' Tennis Balls takes its title from Bosola's line in the play.
- Hotel by Mike Figgis involves a film crew trying to make a Dogme film of The Duchess of Malfi. The actors playing the Duchess, Antonio and Bosola are played by Saffron Burrows, Max Beesley and Heathcote Williams. The play is abbreviated and made into a 'McMalfi' script by Heathcote Williams.
- In the novel Too Many Clients by Rex Stout, a character that does not want to tell his name quotes Other sins only speak; murder shrieks out. The quotation allows Nero Wolfe to find him.
- In the Oxford University Film Foundation's 1982 film Privileged, the students produce and rehearse lines from the play.
- Echo & the Bunnymen mentioned this play along with John Webster and The White Devil in their song "My White Devil" on their Porcupine album.
- Casanova's Chinese Restaurant, volume 5 of Anthony Powell's A Dance to the Music of Time, includes a visit to a performance of the play, where the minor character Moreland is in love with the actress playing Julia.
- In T. H. White's novel The Once and Future King (1958), the character Cully quotes from the play: "Why, but two nights since, one met the duke 'bout midnight in a lane behind Saint Mark's Church, with the leg of a man upon his shoulder: and he howled fearfully."
- Angela Carter drew inspiration for her werewolf stories, The Company of Wolves and Wolf-Alice, in The Bloody Chamber from The Duchess of Malfi, most notably the line "hairy on the inside", but also "the howling of the wolf is music to the screech-owl", and "I'll go hunt the badger by owl-light. 'Tis a deed of darkness."
- In "Death's Shadow," season 2, episode 1 of Midsomer Murders, Detective Chief Inspector Barnaby's actress daughter, Cully, rehearses lines from the play.
- In Ngaio Marsh's 1959 novel Singing in the Shrouds, Mr. Merryman, a retired school teacher and one of several passengers suspected of being a serial killer, argues that The Duchess of Malfi is better than Hamlet or Macbeth and that Othello is much better than all of them.
- The first collection of New Zealand poet Alistair Te Ariki Campbell, published in 1950, was titled Mine Eyes Dazzle. The first part of the collection was a long poem for a friend who had died young, and the collection also features love poems about unattainable and beautiful women; the title of the book combined both themes, having been taken from the line: "Cover her face; mine eyes dazzle; she died young".
- Laura Purcell's novel The Whispering Muse, with its strong theme of theatrical tragedy, features troubled actress Lilith starring in a performance of The Duchess of Malfi.
- In Michael Blakemore's novel "Next Season" a small company is staging a production of The Duchess of Malfi, with the protagonist playing the supporting role of the Doctor.

== See also ==
- The Fatal Secret
