= Atrani, Coast of Amalfi =

Lithograph by M. C. Escher

- Artist: M. C. Escher
- Year: 1931
- Type: Lithograph
- Dimensions: 27.5 cm × 37.9 cm (10.8 in × 14.9 in)

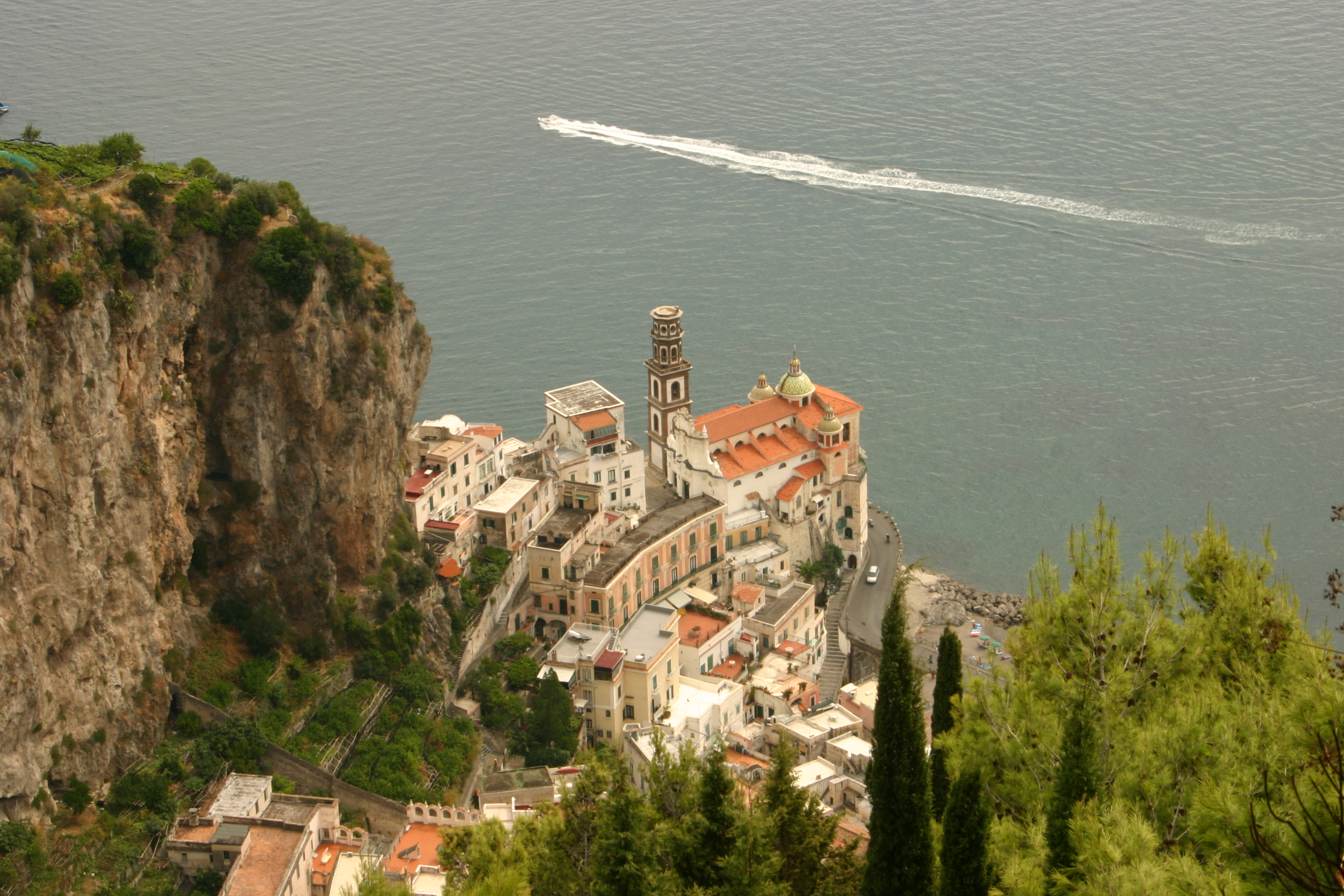
Atrani in 2007.

Atrani, Coast of Amalfi is a lithograph print by the Dutch artist M. C. Escher, first printed in August 1931. Atrani is a small town and commune on the Amalfi Coast in the province of Salerno in the Campania region of south-western Italy. Atrani is the second smallest town in Italy and was built right at the edge of the sea. This image of Atrani recurs several times in Escher's work, most notably in his series of Metamorphosis prints: Metamorphosis I, II and III.

== Sources ==
- Locher, J. L. (2000). The Magic of M. C. Escher. Harry N. Abrams, Inc. ISBN 978-0-8109-6720-5.
