= Dragone (river) =

Location
- Country: Italy

Physical characteristics
- Mouth: Tyrrhenian Sea
  - location: Atrani
  - coordinates: 40.6352°N 14.6090°E

The Dragone is a river of the Amalfi Coast, Italy. It cuts through the Jurassic limestone of the area and emerges at the historic town and beach resort of Atrani.

== History and Geography ==
In the tenth century a number of mills were established along its banks, their only legacy in the place names of the villages found in this narrow valley. Water is precious in these towns, with many houses sold with 'cisterns' listed as an advantage. In summer the river can be completely dry.

In the year 1588, the Dragone flooded, killing two people in Atrani and damaging several houses.

The river received attention on September 9, 2010, when the river flooded its banks, resulting in mudslides in Atrani and the death of one woman.
