= Luigi d'Aragona =

16th-century Catholic bishop

His Eminence Luigi d'Aragona
- Cardinal-Deacon of Santa Maria in Aquiro
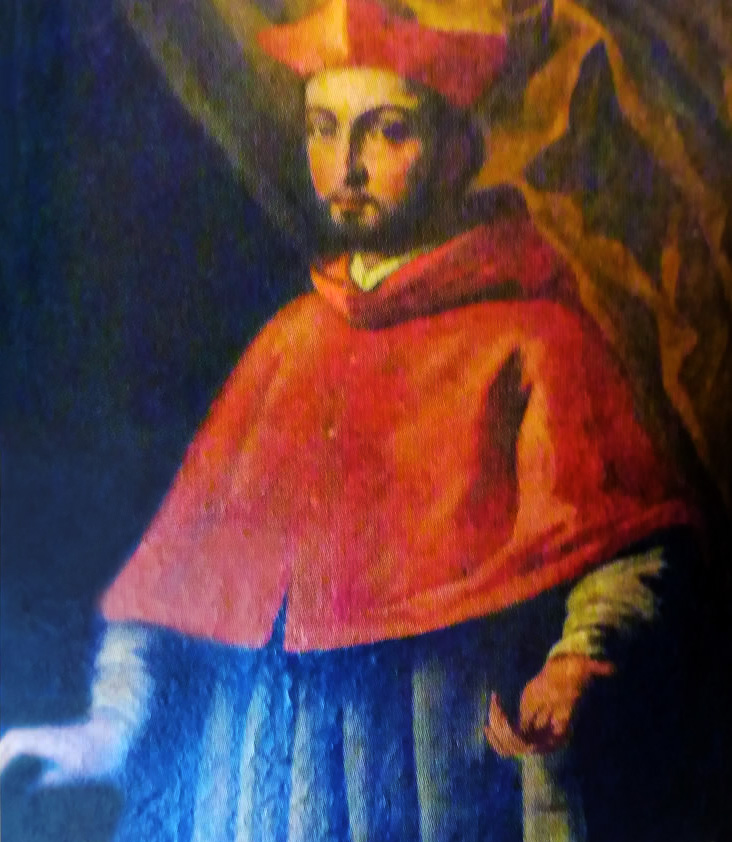
- Cardinal Luigi d'Aragona
- Church: Catholic Church

Personal details
- Born: 7 Sep 1474 Naples, Italy
- Died: 21 Jan 1519 (age 44)

Luigi d'Aragona (1474–1519) (called the Cardinal of Aragón) was an Italian Roman Catholic cardinal. He had a highly successful career in the church, but his memory is affected by the allegation that he ordered the murder of his own sister and two of her children.

== Early life ==
Luigi d'Aragona was born in Naples on 7 September 1474, the son of Arrigo d'Aragona and Polissena de Centellas. His sister was Giovanna d'Aragona, Duchess of Amalfi, and he was the natural grandson of Ferdinand I of Naples. He held the title of marquis of Gerace.

On 3 June 1492, he married Battistina Cibo Usodimare, granddaughter of Pope Innocent VIII, at the Vatican in the presence of the pope. When Battistina died, Luigi ceded his title of marquis to his brother Carlo and determined to enter the ecclesiastical state.

== Ecclesiastical career ==
He received the tonsure on 6 May 1494 from Alessandro Carafa, Archbishop of Naples, in the Archbishop's Palace. He then became a protonotary apostolic. Pope Alexander VI made him a cardinal deacon in pectore in the consistory of May 1494. His creation was published in the consistory of 19 February 1496 and he received the red hat and the deaconry of Santa Maria in Cosmedin.

On 10 December 1498, he became the apostolic administrator of the see of Lecce, holding this post until 24 March 1502. In 1499, he accompanied Joan of Naples to Spain and traveled from there to the Kingdom of France. On 10 March 1501, he became apostolic administrator of the see of Aversa, holding this position until 21 May 1515. He was also administrator of the see of Policastro from 1501 until 22 April 1504, and administrator of the see of Cappacio from 20 January 1503 until 22 March 1514.

Following the death of Pope Alexander VI, he traveled to Rome, arriving on 10 September 1503. He participated in the papal conclave of September 1503 that elected Pope Pius III, and then in the papal conclave of October 1503 that elected Pope Julius II.

He traveled to Venice in 1507. During the War of the League of Cambrai, on 2 January 1511, he followed the pope in his campaign against the French in the siege of Mirandola. He was administrator of the see of Cádiz from 10 February to June 1511; administrator of the see of León from 6 June 1511 to 17 December 1516 and administrator of the see of Cava from 1511 to 5 May 1514.

He assisted at the opening of the Fifth Council of the Lateran; the council later charged him with reforming the church. He participated in the papal conclave of 1513 that elected Pope Leo X. At his request, the new pope removed the censures against Alfonso I d'Este, Duke of Ferrara on 10 April 1513. From 1 September 1513 to 3 March 1518, he served as legate a latere to the March of Ancona and vicar general with special powers. Returning to Rome, he lived in the Piazza Scossacavalli, and accompanied the pope hunting in Magliana, and, in 1516, on a trip to North Italy.

He was administrator of the see of Alessano from 18 May 1517 to 17 May 1518, and administrator of the see of Nardò from 17 June 1517 until his death. In April 1517, he left Rome for a tour of Switzerland, Germany, the Low Countries, and France, where he was entertained lavishly by Francis I of France. He arrived back in Rome on 16 March 1518. The cardinal's secretary, Antonio de Beatis, wrote a history of this trip that is much valued by historians.

He died on 21 January 1519. He is buried in Santa Maria sopra Minerva.

== Death of his sister ==
In 1510, his sister Giovanna d'Aragona, the widowed Duchess of Amalfi, was discovered to have married her majordomo, Antonio Beccadelli di Bologna, and given birth to two children by him. The Cardinal and his brother Carlo were allegedly enraged, perceiving the marriage to be a stain on the family honour. The couple fled from Amalfi with their children, but the duchess was intercepted on her way to Venice. With her children and her maid, she was brought back to Amalfi. None of them were ever seen again. Her husband Antonio was murdered in 1513. Matteo Bandello, who knew her husband, wrote an account of these events, alleging that the Cardinal and his brother had arranged for the Duchess and her children to be strangled, and paid an assassin to kill Antonio.

In John Webster's play The Duchess of Malfi, based on these events, Luigi d'Aragona appears in fictionalised form as "The Cardinal", a villainous figure described by the play's version of Antonio in the words, "the spring in his face is nothing but the engend'ring of toads; where he is jealous of any man, he lays worse plot for them than ever was impos'd on Hercules"

Catholic Church titles
Preceded by Raymond Pérault	Cardinal-Deacon of Santa Maria in Cosmedin; 1496-1519	Succeeded by Franciotto Orsini
Preceded by Antonio de' Tolomei	Administrator of Lecce; 1498-1502	Succeeded by Giacomo Piscicelli
Preceded by Gabriele Altilio	Administrator of Policastro; 1501-1504	Succeeded by Bernardo Lauri
Preceded by Giovanni Paolo Vassalli	Administrator of Aversa; 1501-1515	Succeeded by Silvio Pandoni
Preceded by Ludovico Podocathor	Administrator of Capaccio; 1503-1514	Succeeded by Lorenzo Pucci
Preceded by Giovanni Colonna	Cardinal-Deacon of Santa Maria in Aquiro; 1508-1517	Succeeded by Guillaume de Croy
Preceded by Ludovico Trevisano	Administrator of Cava de' Tirreni; 1511-1514	Succeeded by Pietro Sanfelice
Preceded by Pedro Fernández de Solís	Administrator of Cádiz; 1511	Succeeded by Pietro de Accolti de Aretio
Preceded by Francesco Alidosi	Administrator of León; 1511-1516	Succeeded by Esteban Gabriel Merino
Preceded by Giovanni Antonio Acquaviva d'Aragona	Administrator of Alessano; 1517-1518	Succeeded by Agostino Trivulzio
Preceded by Antonio de Caro	Administrator of Nardò; 1517-1519	Succeeded by Marco Cornaro
