= Tancred and Gismund =

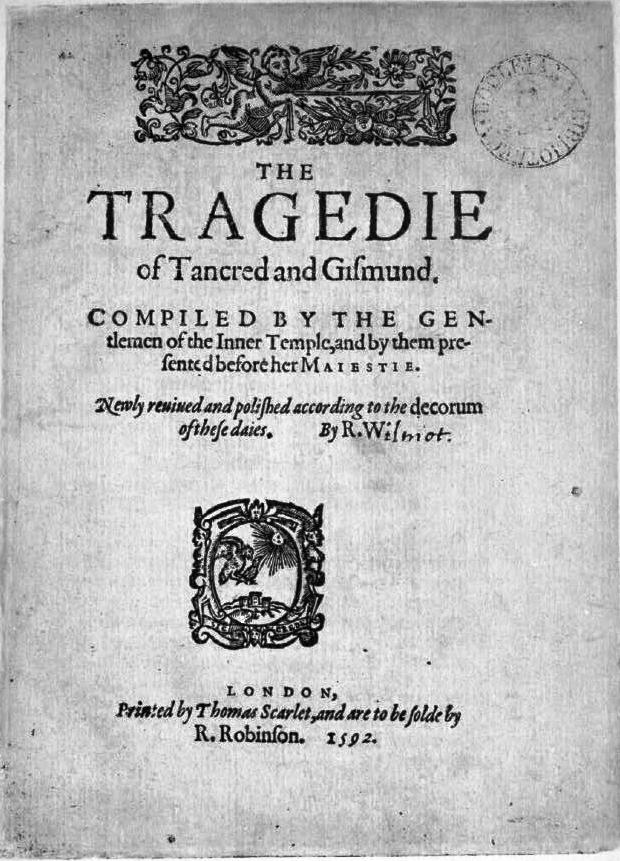
Title page of the second edition of The Tragedie of Tancred and Gismund, published in 1592.

Tancred and Gismund (Gismond variant spelling) is an English Elizabethan verse drama published in 1591. It is a revised version of Gismund of Salerne, a play that was written and produced for the queen in 1566 by the gentlemen of the Inner Temple. The earliest extant English play derived from an Italian novel, each of the five acts was produced by a different author.

The play tells the story of a father, Tancred, whose widowed daughter, Gismund, returns home and begins a clandestine affair with one of her father's courtiers. He kills her lover and presents her with a gold cup containing his heart. She kills herself, and her father, stricken by grief and regret, does likewise, thereby extinguishing his kingly line.

The play has been seen as an admonition to Queen Elizabeth I to choose a husband so that she might bear an heir, based on suitability rather than love.

== Characters ==
- Tancred – King of Naples and Prince of Salerne
- Gismund – widow, daughter of Tancred
- Guiszard – Count Palurin, Gismund's lover
- Julio – Lord Chamberlain to Tancred
- Lucrece – sister to Tancred
- Renuchio – Captain of Tancred's guard
- Cupid – God of love
- Megaera – a fury
- Chorus of four maidens
- Guard
- Two furies

== Plot ==
Tancred gave his only daughter, Gismund, to a foreign prince in marriage. After the death of her husband she returns home to her father, who had missed her so much during her marriage that he is determined that she never again marry. She falls in love with the Guiszard, Count Palurin, one of her father's courtiers, and he with her. She is able to meet with her lover by means of a secret cave under her bedroom, passing him the time of their meetings by concealing a letter in a cane. She meets her lover in the vault one day and while she is out her father comes looking for her. Thinking she has taken a walk, he lies on her bed, covers his head with a curtain and falls asleep. The lovers return and Tancred wakes and witnesses her daughter give herself to Guiszard.

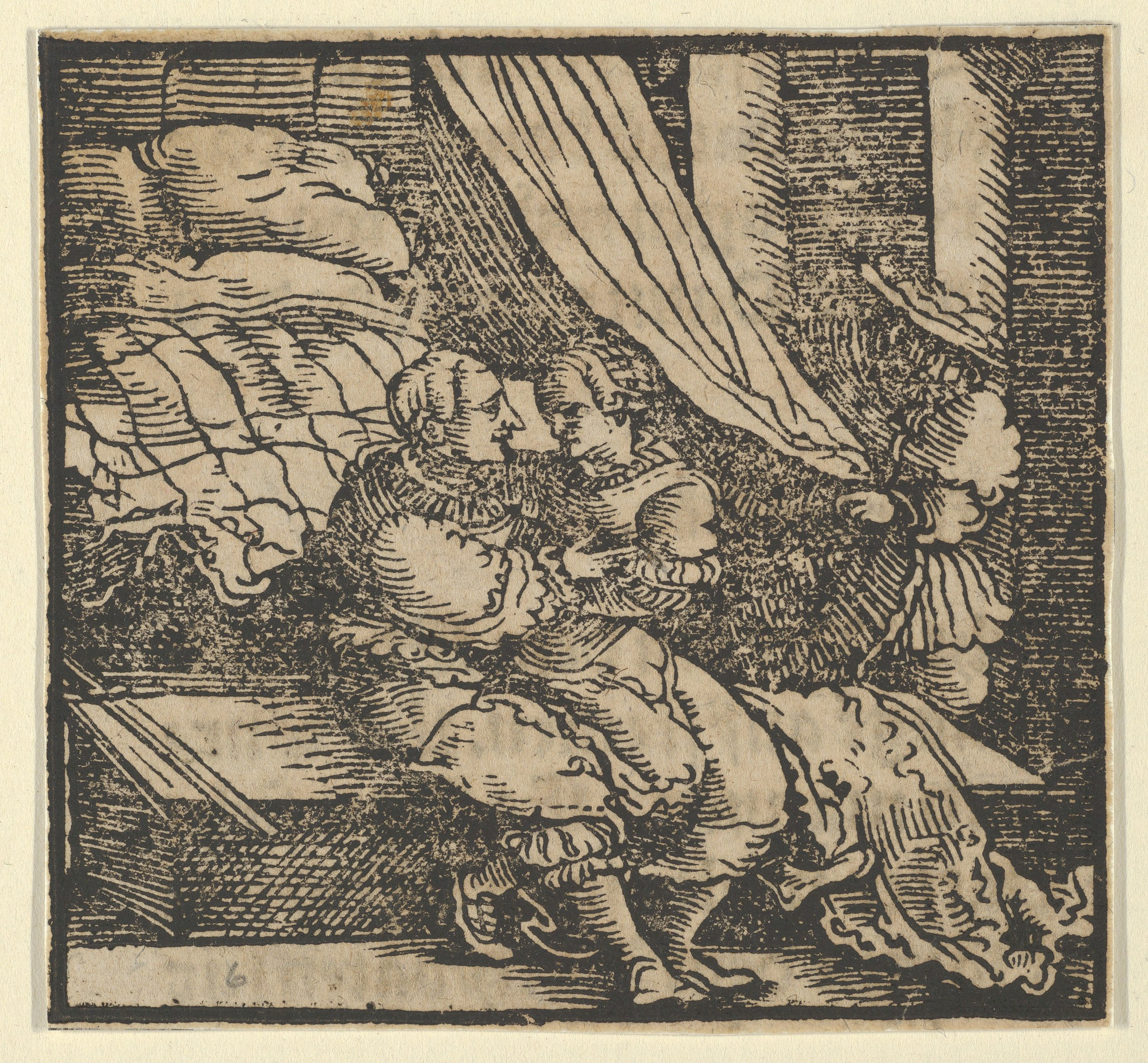
Engraving showing Ghismonda and Guiscardo being discovered by the Prince of Salerno

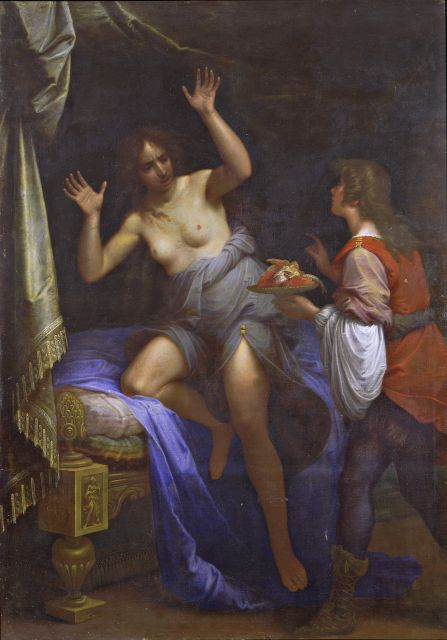
Mario Balassi painting of Ghismonda being given a golden cup with her lover's heart

Stunned, he says nothing but has Guiszard arrested and his heart cut out and placed in a golden cup, which is then delivered to Gismund. She fills the cup with tears and poison and drinks it. Too late, her father comes in. He grants her dying wish that she be entombed with her lover. Tancred fulfills his pledge and then kills himself as a warning to all hard-hearted fathers.

== Sources ==
The main source of the play is "The Tale of Ghismonda and Guiscardo" from the first novella of Day Four of the Decameron. The tale was translated in William Painter's Palace of Pleasure (1566), but internal evidence indicates the authors worked from the original, and not Painter's translation. The play inspired at least five English tragedies by 1623, and in Elizabethan England was second only to Romeus and Juliet as a story of tragic love.

== Date and text ==
The published play is a rewritten version of Gismund of Salerne, of which two manuscript copies survive, that was written and produced by five members of the Inner Temple for Queen Elizabeth during the revels entertainments. Each act was written by a different author, named respectively as Rod. Stafford, Hen. Noel, G. Al., Ch. Hatton, and Robert Wilmot. The play was revised in keeping with "the decorum of these daies" by recasting the original rhyming lines into blank verse.

Earlier critics dated the original play 1567-8 by taking Wilmot's prefatory reference to his fellow Inner Temple collaborators to "the loue that hath bin these 24 yeres betwixt vs" and working back from the publication date. Chambers dates the play earlier to Shrovetide, between 24 and 26 February 1566 from an allusion in the manuscript to its performance at Greenwich and matching that to Elizabeth's itinerary.

== Bibliography ==
- Cunliffe, John W., ed. (1912), "Gismond of Salerne", Early English Classical Tragedies, Oxford: Clarendon Press.
- Winkelman, Michael A. (2005), Marriage Relationships in Tudor Political Drama, Aldershot UK: Ashgate, ISBN 0-7546-3682-8.
- Cunliffe, John W. (1906), "Gismond of Salerne", PMLA, 21 (2): 435–461, doi:10.2307/456518, JSTOR 456518, S2CID 163733111.
- Kiefer, Frederick (1977), "Love and Fortune in Boccaccio's Tancredi and Ghismonda Story and in Willmot's Gismond of Salerne", Renaissance et Réforme (1): 36–45.
