= Malcontent =

Character archetype common in early modern drama

The malcontent is a character type that often appeared in early modern drama. The character, usually an unhappy outsider, but always dissatisfied, observes and comments on the action, and is sometimes metafictionally aware that they are in a play.

== Role ==
The character is discontented with the social structure and other characters in the play, and is often an outsider who observes and comments on the action, and may even acknowledge they are in a play. Shakespeare's Richard III, Iago in Othello, and Jaques in As You Like It are typical malcontents.

The role is usually both political and dramatic, with the malcontent voicing dissatisfaction with the usually Machiavellian political atmosphere and often using asides to build up a kind of self-consciousness and awareness of the text itself that other characters in the play lack.

== Examples ==
Important malcontents include Bosola in Webster's The Duchess of Malfi, Vindice in Middleton's The Revenger's Tragedy, Malevole in Marston's The Malcontent, and Hamlet in Shakespeare's Hamlet.

== Morality and sympathy ==
The morality and sympathy of the malcontent is highly variable, as in the examples above. Sometimes, as in Hamlet and The Malcontent, they are the sympathetic centre of the play, whereas Iago is a very unsympathetic character. The most important thing about the malcontent is that the character is malcontent—unhappy, unsettled, displeased with the world of the play, eager to change it somehow, or to dispute with it.

== Objectivity ==
The malcontent is an objective or quasi-objective voice that comments on the play's concerns as though somehow above or beyond them. The concept has much to do with the Renaissance idea of humorism and a surfeit of "black bile" which caused melancholy.

There is an ontological argument regarding Iago: if a malcontent is dissatisfied due to a displacement from their place in the social order, then Iago does not fit. His scheming and disaffection is not clearly motivated by resentment stemming from an injustice done to him.

== Sources ==
- Callaghan, Dympna (1989). Woman and Gender in Renaissance Tragedy: A Study of King Lear, Othello, The Duchess of Malfi, and The White Devil. Humanities Press International. ISBN 9780391035904.
- Spencer, Theodore (1948). "The Elizabethan Malcontent". In McManaway, James G.; Dawson, Giles E.; Willoughby, Edwin E. (eds.). Joseph Quincy Adams Memorial Studies. Folger Publications. Washington: Folger Shakespeare Library. pp. 523–535. OCLC 316743.
- Stoll, Elmer Edgar (1906). "Shakspere, Marston, and the Malcontent Type". Modern Philology. 3 (3). The University of Chicago Press: 281–303. doi:10.1086/386677. eISSN 1545-6951. ISSN 0026-8232. JSTOR 432651. S2CID 161511631.
- Stoll, Elmer Edgar (1952). "Iago Not a 'Malcontent'". The Journal of English and Germanic Philology. 51 (2). University of Illinois Press: 163–167. ISSN 0363-6941. JSTOR 27713401.
