= Alfonso II Piccolomini =

Alfonso II Piccolomini (10 March 1499 – 17 February 1559) was a Neapolitan nobleman and military leader who held the office of Duke of Amalfi throughout his life. He belonged to the Sienese Piccolomini family and served as imperial governor of the Republic of Siena from 1529 until 1541.

Alfonso was born in Naples on 10 March 1499, the posthumous son of Alfonso I Piccolomini by his wife Giovanna d'Aragona. In 1517, he married Costanza, the daughter of Innico II d'Avalos and protégée of Costanza d'Avalos, Duchess of Francavilla. Contemporary chroniclers report his numerous infidelities, but he had seven legitimate children, four sons and three daughters, all but two of whom survived to adulthood.

Alfonso was a Habsburg loyalist during the Italian Wars. When the fighting came to Naples during the War of the League of Cognac in 1528, he was appointed to the war council that advised the viceroy, Philibert of Chalon. He personally oversaw the defence of the cities he held in fief: Amalfi, Ravello and Scala.

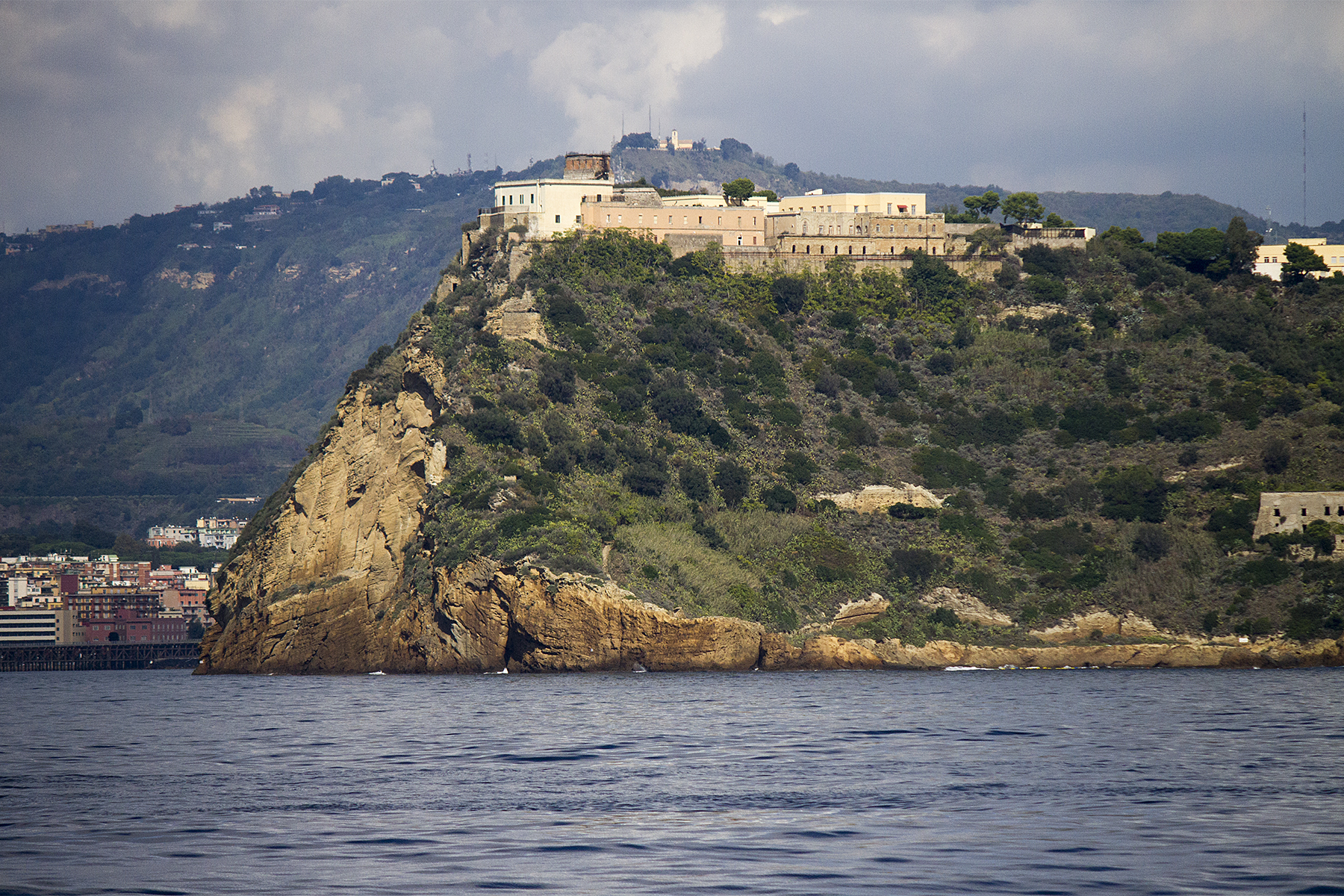
The castle of Nisida in the Gulf of Naples today

In the summer of 1529, Alfonso was appointed captain-general of the Republic of Siena with command of the garrison of Spanish troops sent by the Emperor Charles V, who was also king of Spain and Naples. The return of exiled Noveschi rendered the situation at Siena unfavourable, and Alfonso was recalled to Naples in 1531. He returned to Siena in 1532 and remained there as the imperial governor and captain-general of the Spanish garrison until 1541, mediating between political factions to maintain the peace.

His removal in 1541 has been related to rumours that Alfonso had entered talks with the French, but there is no evidence for actual disloyalty. In 1553, Alfonso purchased the island of Nisida and began constructing a massive castle that could serve as both the centre of a refined aristocratic court and part of a strategic line of defence in the Gulf of Naples. He liquidated much of his family's silver to fund the building.

On 1 April 1554, Alfonso was appointed to the Collateral Council, the highest governing body in the kingdom. He died in his castle on Nisida after an attack of gout on 17 February 1559. He was succeeded as duke of Amalfi by his son Innico, who in 1538 had married his cousin, Silvia Piccolomini, thus uniting the Sienese and Neapolitan branches of the family. Another son, Pompeo, became the bishop of Tropea.
