= William Painter (author) =

English translator and author (c. 1540 – 1595)

William Painter (or Paynter, c. 1540 – between 19 and 22 February 1595) was an English author and translator. As a clerk of the Ordnance in the Tower of London, he was accused of fraud aimed at amassing a personal fortune at public expense. He is best known for his anthology of translations, The Palace of Pleasure.

== Personal life ==
Painter was long believed to be a native of Kent due to confusion with a namesake, who matriculated at St John's College, Cambridge in 1554.

Painter married Dorothy Bonham in about 1565. They had at least five children – a son and four daughters. By 1587 their son Anthony had joined his father in his government work.

Painter made an oral will dated 14 February 1594 and died between 19 and 22 February 1595 in London. He was buried in St Olave Hart Street, not far from the Tower.

== Administrative career ==
In 1561 Painter became a clerk of the Ordnance in the Tower of London, a post he held for the rest of his life. In 1566 the Lieutenant-General of the Ordnance, Edward Randolph, supplemented Painter's income with an annuity and a pension.

Throughout his career, there were accusations of fraud and abuse of his position, in which he aimed to amass a personal fortune out of public funds. This culminated in 1586, when the Surveyor of the Ordnance, John Powell, accused Painter and two others of peculation (embezzlement). As his co-accused were deceased, only Painter could defend himself. He confessed that he owed the government a sum of just over £1000. Although he offered to repay this, the debt was not discharged until the time of Painter's grandson due to delays in his lifetime and discovery of more discrepancies after his death. The accusations notably comprise charges and counter-charges between government officials, which point to endemic corruption in the Elizabethan civil service.

== Literary work ==
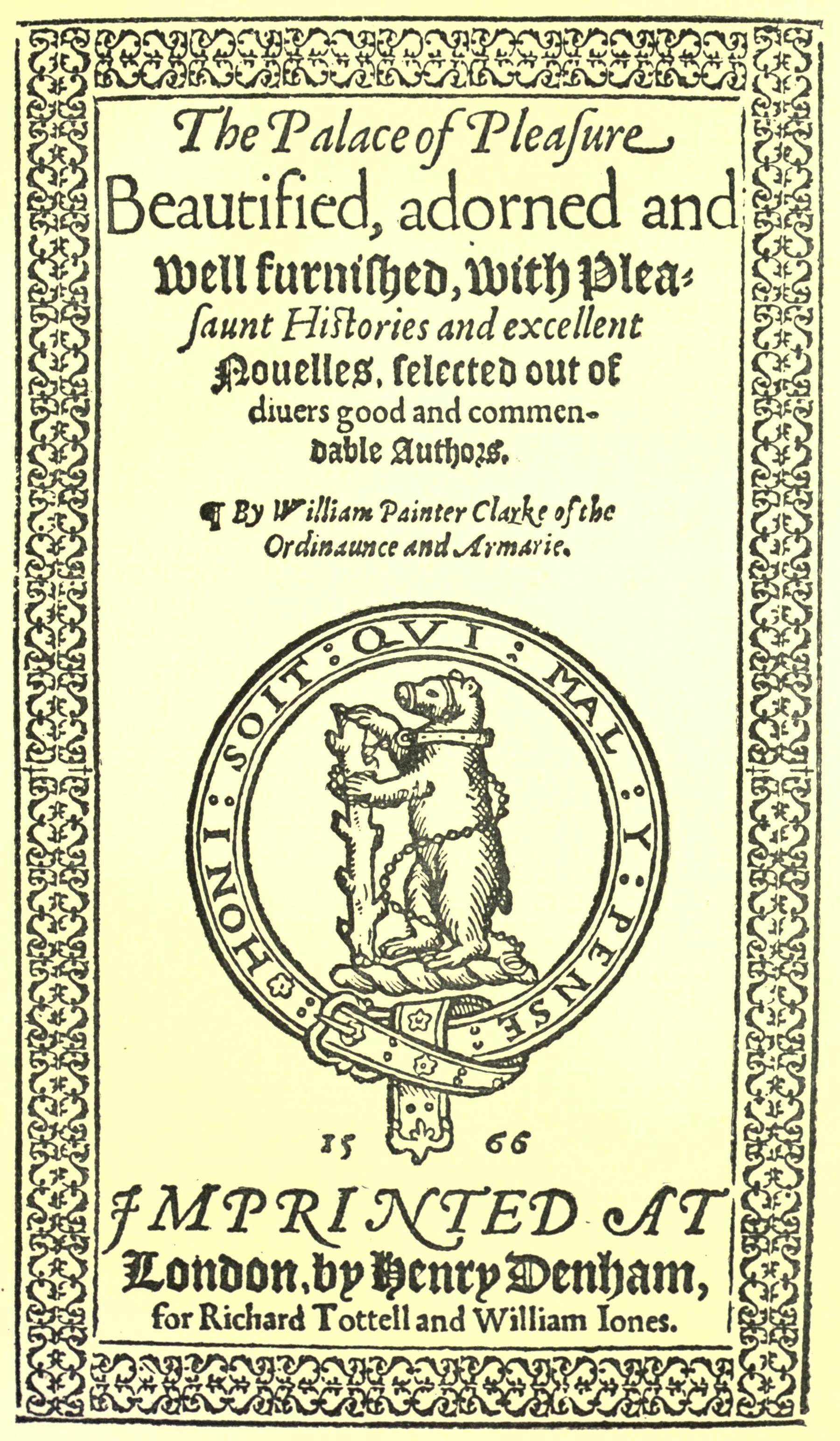
The Palace of Pleasure, 1566

Painter began translating into English in 1558 with Nicholas à Moffan's Soltani Soymanni Turcorum Imperatoris horrendum facinus, as Horrible and Cruell Murder of Sultan Solyman. The work later became Novel 34 in his The Palace of Pleasure.

The first volume of Painter's The Palace of Pleasure appeared in 1566, dedicated to the Earl of Warwick. It included 60 tales and was followed in the next year by a second volume of 34. A second, improved edition in 1575 contained seven further stories. For these Painter borrowed from Herodotus, Boccaccio, Plutarch, Aulus Gellius, Aelian, Livy, Tacitus, Quintus Curtius, Giovanni Battista Giraldi, Matteo Bandello, Ser Giovanni Fiorentino, Giovanni Francesco Straparola, Queen Marguerite de Navarre and others.

The notable fashion for Italian settings in Elizabethan drama derived partly from the vogue for Painter's work and similar collections.

The early tragedies Appius and Virginia, and Tancred and Gismund were taken from The Palace of Pleasure. Shakespeare's Romeo and Juliet, Timon of Athens, Edward III, and All's Well That Ends Well are all derived from Painter, the last from his translation of Giletta of Narbonne. Other playwrights likewise made extensive use of work by Painter and similar translators. This is believed to be the case with well-known works such as Beaumont and Fletcher's Triumph of Death, John Webster's The Duchess of Malfi (from Belleforest), and James Shirley's Love's Cruelty.

The Palace of Pleasure was edited by Joseph Haslewood in 1813. This edition was collated (1890) with the British Museum copy of 1575 by Joseph Jacobs, who added further prefatory matter, including some on the importance of the Italian novella in Elizabethan drama.

It has been suggested that Painter was responsible for the 1580 work A Moorning Diti upon the Deceas of the High and Mighti Prins Henri, Earl of Arundel, attributed to Guil. P. G.

== Namesakes ==
Painter had at least one contemporary namesake. One attended Cambridge in 1554–1557, matriculating from St John's College. This may be the same William Painter as the schoolmaster of Sevenoaks School, Kent. He translated William Fulke's Antiprognosticon, published in 1560, writing the dedication "From Seuenoke xxii. of Octobre". Fulke was a contemporary at St John's College. William Painter the schoolmaster died in Sevenoaks in June 1561, leaving a widow, Alice. Church of England records include one or more individuals named William Painter or William Paynter, with ordinations in 1560 and 1561 and appointments in the dioceses of Bath and Wells, Canterbury, Rochester and Lincoln. One William Painter died in London about 1597, leaving a widow, Winifred, and was interred at St Mary Aldermanbury.

== Sources ==
- Lee, Sidney (1895). "Painter, William" . In Lee, Sidney (ed.). Dictionary of National Biography. Vol. 43. London: Smith, Elder & Co.
- Kelly, L. G. "Painter, William (1540?–1595)". Oxford Dictionary of National Biography (online ed.). Oxford University Press. doi:10.1093/ref:odnb/21135. (Subscription, Wikipedia Library access or UK public library membership required.)
