= Regular Division of the Plane =

Series of drawings by M. C. Escher

Regular Division of the Plane III, woodcut, 1957 - 1958.

Regular Division of the Plane is a series of drawings by the Dutch artist M. C. Escher which began in 1936. These images are based on the principle of tessellation, irregular shapes or combinations of shapes that interlock completely to cover a surface or plane.

The inspiration for these works began in 1936 with a visit to the Alhambra, a fourteenth-century Moorish castle near Granada, Spain. Escher had visited the Alhambra once before in 1922 but in this visit he had spent several days studying and sketching the ornate tile designs there.

In 1958 Escher published his book The Regular Division of the Plane. This book included several woodcut prints to demonstrate the concept, but the series of drawings continued until the late 1960s, ending at drawing #137. While not Escher's most artistically important works, some of these patterns are among Escher's most famous, having been used for a number of commercial products, including neckties.
