= Alfonso I Piccolomini =

Coat of arms of Piccolomini

Alfonso I Piccolomini (1468–1498) was Duke of Amalfi. He was the son of Antonio Piccolomini, who had been granted the title Duke of Amalfi in 1461, for his services to king Ferdinand I of Naples. His mother was Maria Marzano d'Aragona. In 1490 he married Giovanna d'Aragona.

He succeeded to the Duchy in 1493. In 1497 he attended the coronation of King Frederick II of Naples in Capua. In the following year he visited Abruzzi in order to assert his control over territory there. He came into conflict with Carlo Sanframondi, the Count of Celano, who disputed Alfonso's rights in the area. When he confronted the count in person at Solmona, their argument escalated into violence. Alfonso struck the count, who responded by stabbing and wounding him. On the count's orders, one of the count's soldiers then finished off the wounded Duke.

Alfonso was buried in the church of Capestrano in Abruzzi. Alfonso's wife was pregnant at the time of her husband's death. She gave birth to their son, Alfonso II five months later.
