= Three Spheres II =

1946 lithograph by M. C. Escher

- Artist: M. C. Escher
- Year: 1946
- Type: lithograph
- Dimensions: 26.9 cm × 46.3 cm (10.6 in × 18.2 in)

Three Spheres II is a lithograph print by the Dutch artist M. C. Escher first printed in April 1946. It depicts three spheres resting on a flat surface.

The sphere on the left is a transparent ball lens with a photorealistic depiction of the refracted light cast through it towards the viewer and onto the flat surface.

The sphere in the center is reflective. Its reflection is a self-replicating image of Escher in his studio drawing the three spheres. In the reflection one can clearly see the image of the three spheres on the paper Escher is drawing on: in the center sphere of that image, one can vaguely make out the reflection of Escher's studio, which is depicted in the main image. This process is implied to be infinite, recursive.

The sphere on the right is opaque and diffuse, i.e. neither specularly reflective nor transparent.

The painting is in the Escher Museum in The Hague.

== See also ==
- Still Life with Spherical Mirror
- Hand with Reflecting Sphere
- Printmaking

== Sources ==
- Locher, J. L. (2000). The Magic of M. C. Escher. Harry N. Abrams, Inc. ISBN 0-8109-6720-0.
