= Friedrich Haag =

Friedrich Haag may refer to:

- Friedrich Haag (crystallographer)
- Friedrich Haag (politician)
