= Noordeinde Palace =

- Paleis Noordeinde
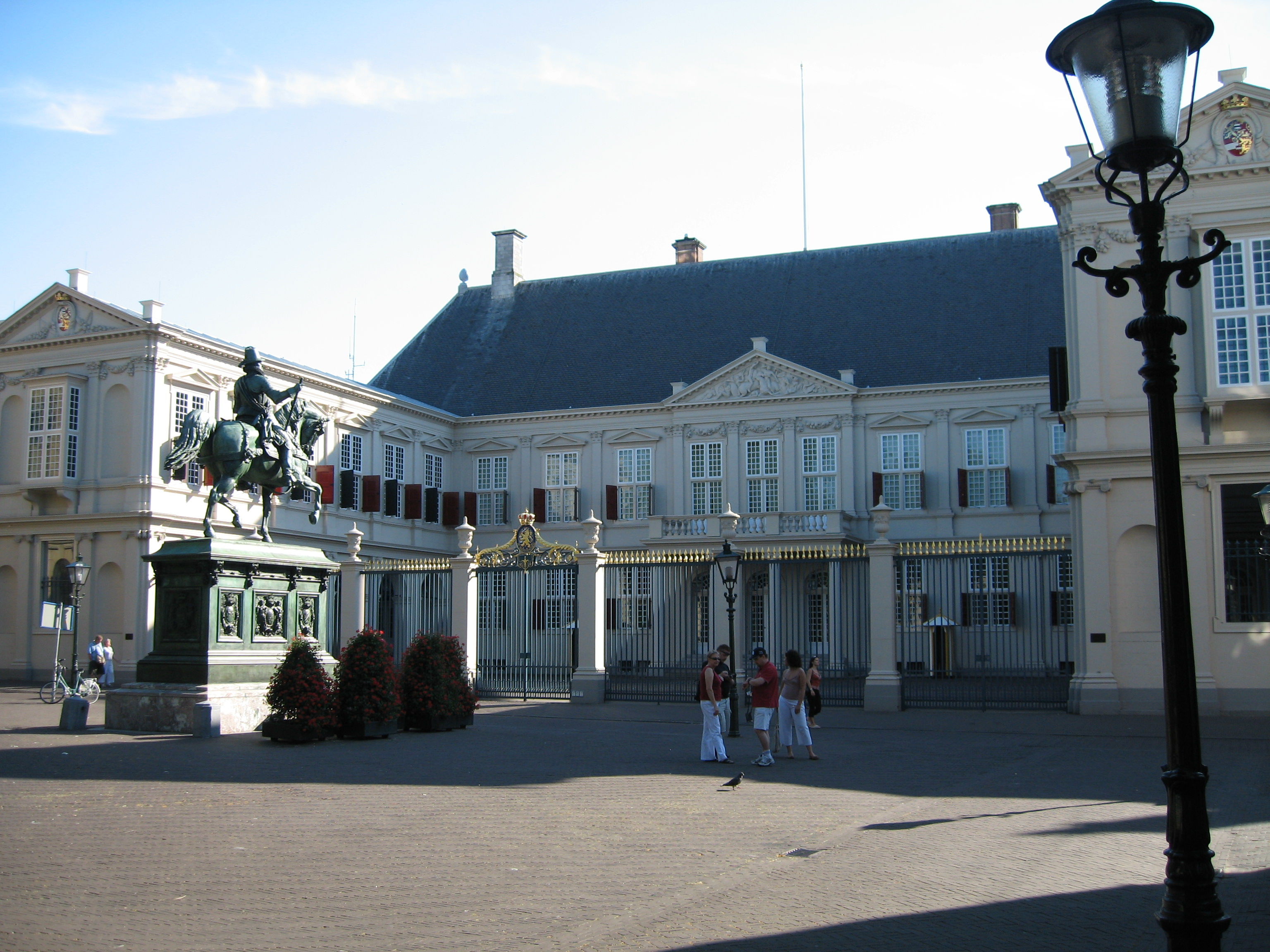
- A front view of the palace in 2006
- Interactive map of the Noordeinde Palace area

General information
- Type: Working palace
- Architectural style: Dutch Classicism
- Location: The Hague, Netherlands, Noordeinde 68
- Coordinates: 52.080833°N 4.306111°E
- Current tenants: King Willem-Alexander
- Completed: 1640
- Owner: State of the Netherlands

Design and construction
- Architects: Pieter Post and Jacob van Campen

Noordeinde Palace (Dutch: Paleis Noordeinde, Dutch pronunciation: [paːˌlɛis noːrtˈɛində]) is one of three official palaces of the Dutch royal family. Located in the city centre of The Hague in the province of South Holland, it has been used as the official workplace of King Willem-Alexander and Queen Máxima since 2013. The Noordeinde Palace and its surrounding palace grounds are property of the Dutch State.

== Palace grounds ==
Map of the palace grounds in the city center of The Hague

The Noordeinde Palace building is located at the palace grounds in the city center of The Hague, which also contains the Royal Stables (Dutch: Koninklijke Stallen), Palace Gardens, Royal Archives, and Dome of Fagel. The Palace Gardens are open to the public daily between sunrise and sunset, while the buildings on the palace grounds are only open to the public during specific days of the year.

== From farmhouse to palace ==
The palace originated as a medieval farmhouse, which was converted into a spacious residence by the steward of the States of Holland and West Friesland, Willem van de Goudt. The farmhouse was built at the borders of the city of The Hague in 1533, in a street called Int Nortende (now: Noordeinde, lit.: in the North End), while the building is located in the city center of modern The Hague. The original farmhouse's cellars can still be seen in the palace basement.

From 1566 to 1591, the palace had a different owner. After that it was leased, and in 1595, purchased by the States of Holland for Louise de Coligny, the widow of William the Silent, and her son Frederick Henry, Prince of Orange. In recognition of William's service to the nation, the States presented the building to his family in 1609.

Frederick Henry substantially enlarged the house, which was then known as the Oude Hof. He began by buying the surrounding plots of land. The architects Pieter Post and Jacob van Campen, who built Huis ten Bosch Palace in 1645, were among those involved in the alterations of 1640. The alterations included lengthening the main building and adding wings on either side, thus creating the characteristic H-form that is seen today.

After Frederik Hendrik died in 1647, his widow, Amalia of Solms-Braunfels, spent much of her time at the Oude Hof. Following her death in 1675, the house was more or less empty for many years. After the death of the Stadholder-king William III in 1702, it passed to King Frederick I of Prussia, a grandson of Frederick Henry's.

In 1740, Voltaire stayed in one of the apartments while he negotiated with Dutch publisher Jan van Duren about the Anti-Machiavel. In 1754, King Frederick the Great of Prussia sold his land-holdings in the Netherlands to Stadholder William V.

The son of Stadholder William V, who would become King William I, took up residence at the Oude Hof in 1792. But when the French invaded the Netherlands in 1795, during the French Revolutionary Wars, he and his family were forced to flee to Britain. The Oude Hof became the property of the Batavian Republic and hence state property, the status it has today.

== Royal palace ==
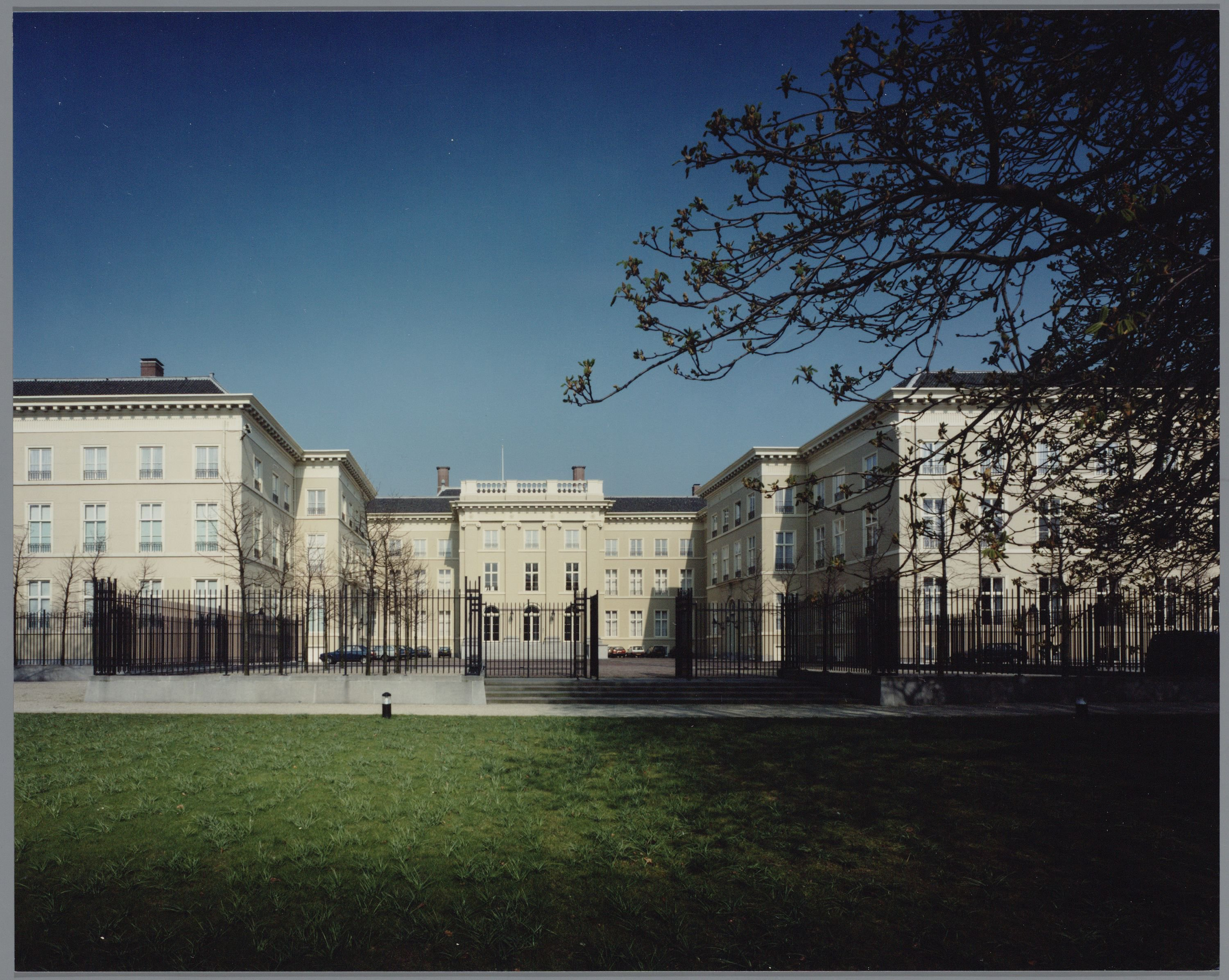
the 19th-century rear facade in neoclassical style

In 1813, after the fall of Napoleon, Prince William returned to the Netherlands, where he was proclaimed Sovereign Prince.

The Constitution of the time decreed that the State must provide a summer and a winter home for the sovereign. Initially there were plans to build a new winter residence, but in the end it was decided to make extensive alterations to the Oude Hof. The palace was extended in 1814 to the back, including the addition of the Ballroom.

King William I moved into Noordeinde Palace in 1817, living there until his abdication in 1840. His successor, King William II, never resided there. Like his grandfather, King William III used Noordeinde as his winter home, though he preferred to live at his summer residence, Het Loo Palace in Apeldoorn. In 1876, he had the royal stables built in the gardens behind Noordeinde Palace.

Even after King William III married Queen Emma, the royal family continued to use Noordeinde as their winter home. Their daughter, Princess Wilhelmina, was born there in 1880, and Queen Emma and her daughter spent their winters at Noordeinde after the King's death in 1890. In 1895, the Queen Regent had premises for the Royal Archives built in the grounds.

== Modern palace ==
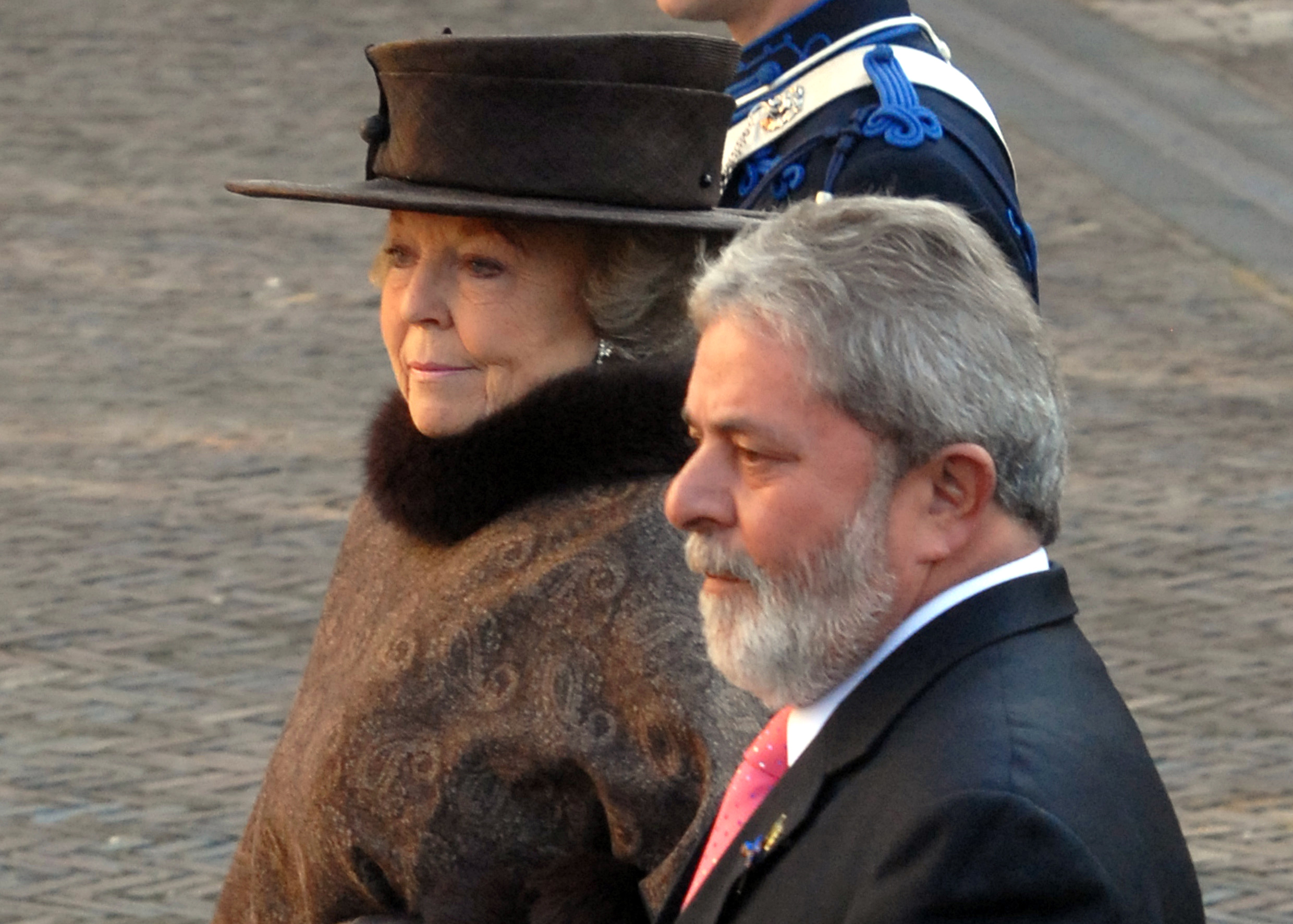
Queen Beatrix and Brazilian president Lula at the Noordeinde Palace during his visit to the Netherlands

In 1901, Queen Emma moved to Lange Voorhout Palace, today's Escher Museum, while Queen Wilhelmina and her husband Prince Hendrik remained at Noordeinde.

Until the German invasion in 1940, Queen Wilhelmina continued to make frequent use of Noordeinde Palace. After the war, the palace was again used as the Queen's winter residence.

In 1948, the central section of the palace was destroyed by fire. That same year Juliana acceded to the throne. She preferred Soestdijk Palace as her official residence, though some members of the Royal Household continued to use offices in Noordeinde. Between 1952 and 1976 the International Institute of Social Studies was based in the north wing of the palace. Following a thorough restoration in 1984, the palace became the Dutch monarch's workplace and office for all political and state affairs.

=== Royal events ===
The palace has been the wedding location of several members of the Dutch Royal family, e.g., former Queen and her husband, Juliana and Prince Bernhard, and the youngest brother of the Dutch King and his wife, Prince Constantijn and Princess Laurentien. Furthermore, Queen Juliana (2004), Prince Hendrik (1934), Prince Claus (2002) and Prince Bernhard (2004) lay in state at the Noordeinde Palace after their deaths.

== Gallery ==
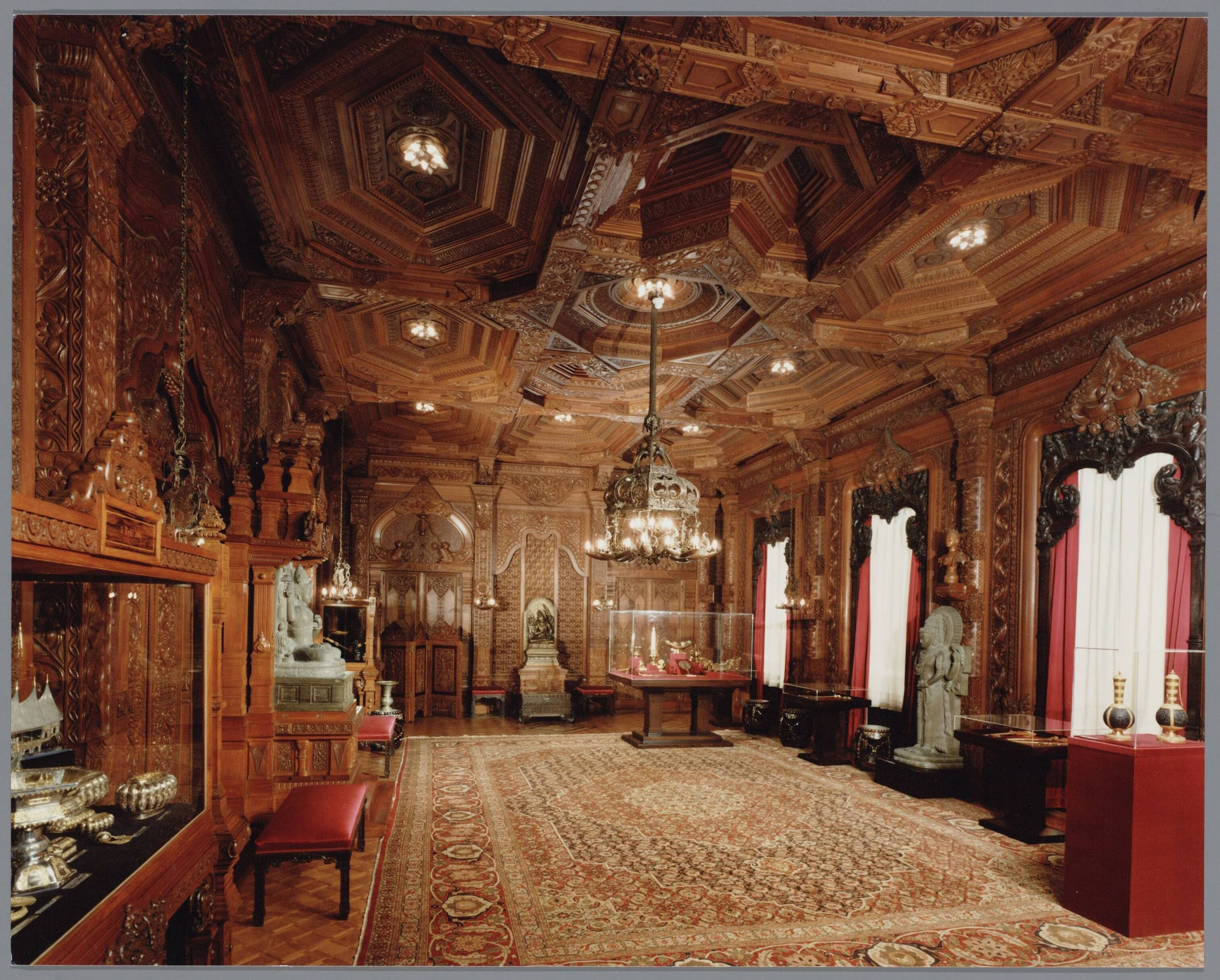
Indian Room

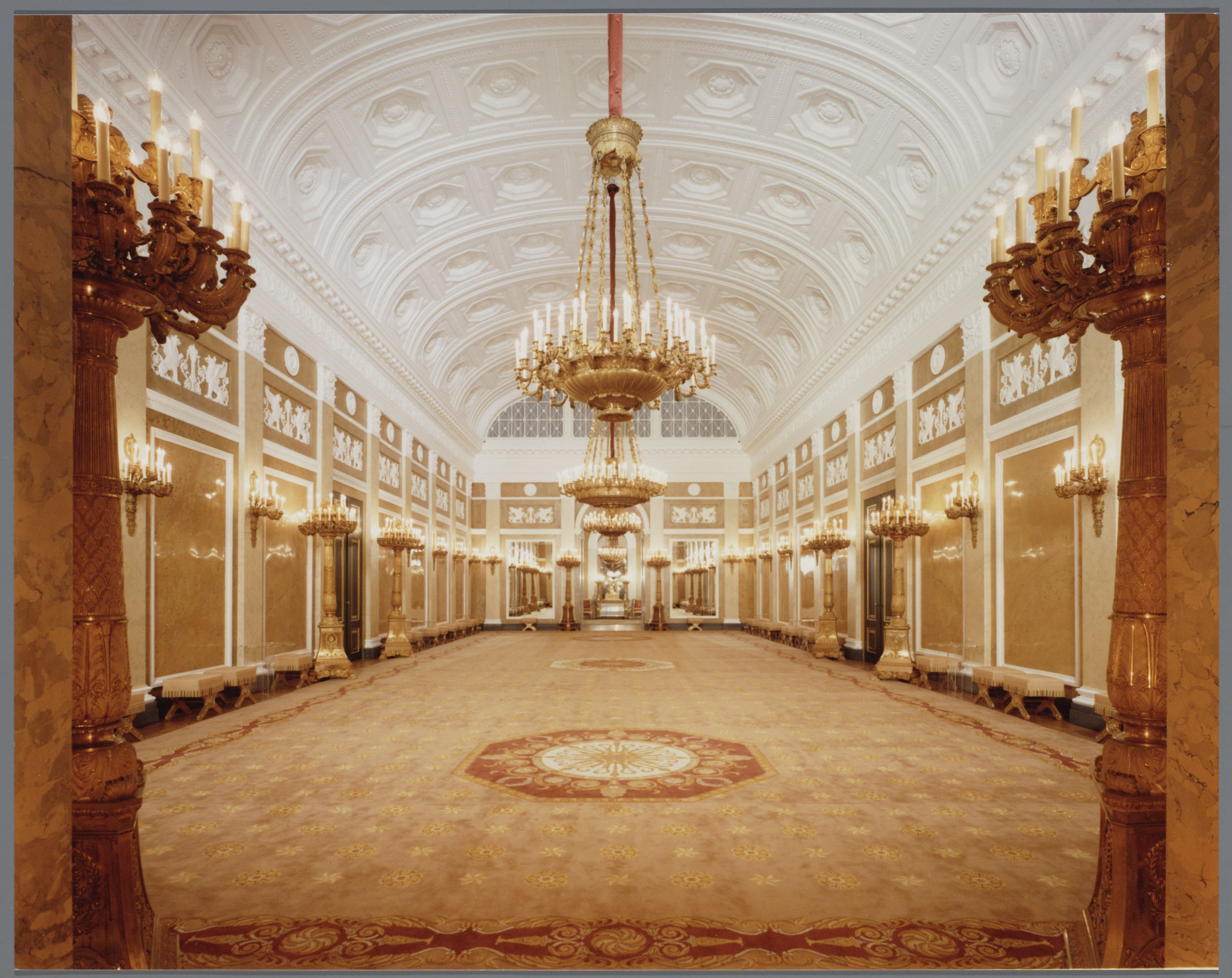
Ballroom

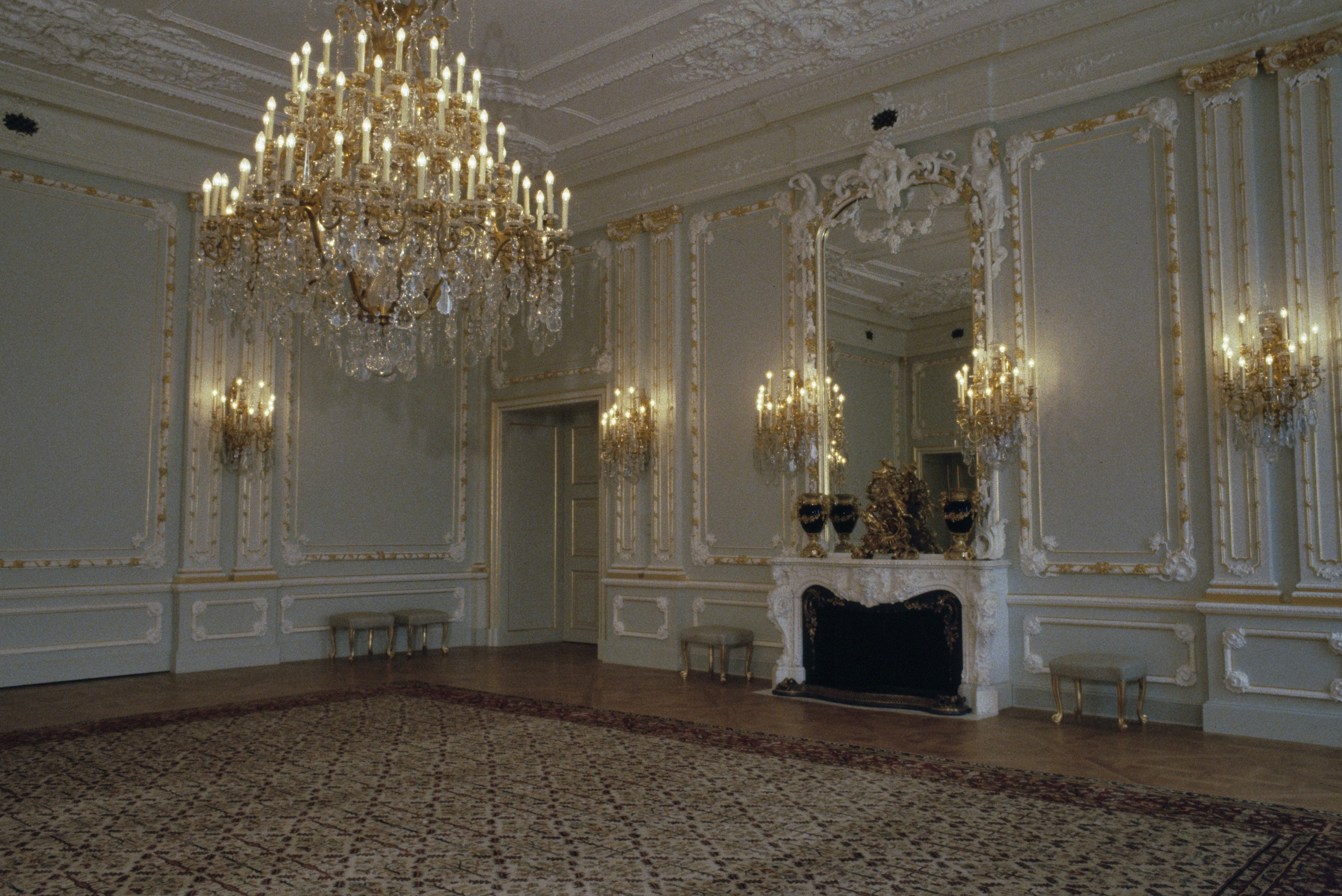
Little Ballroom

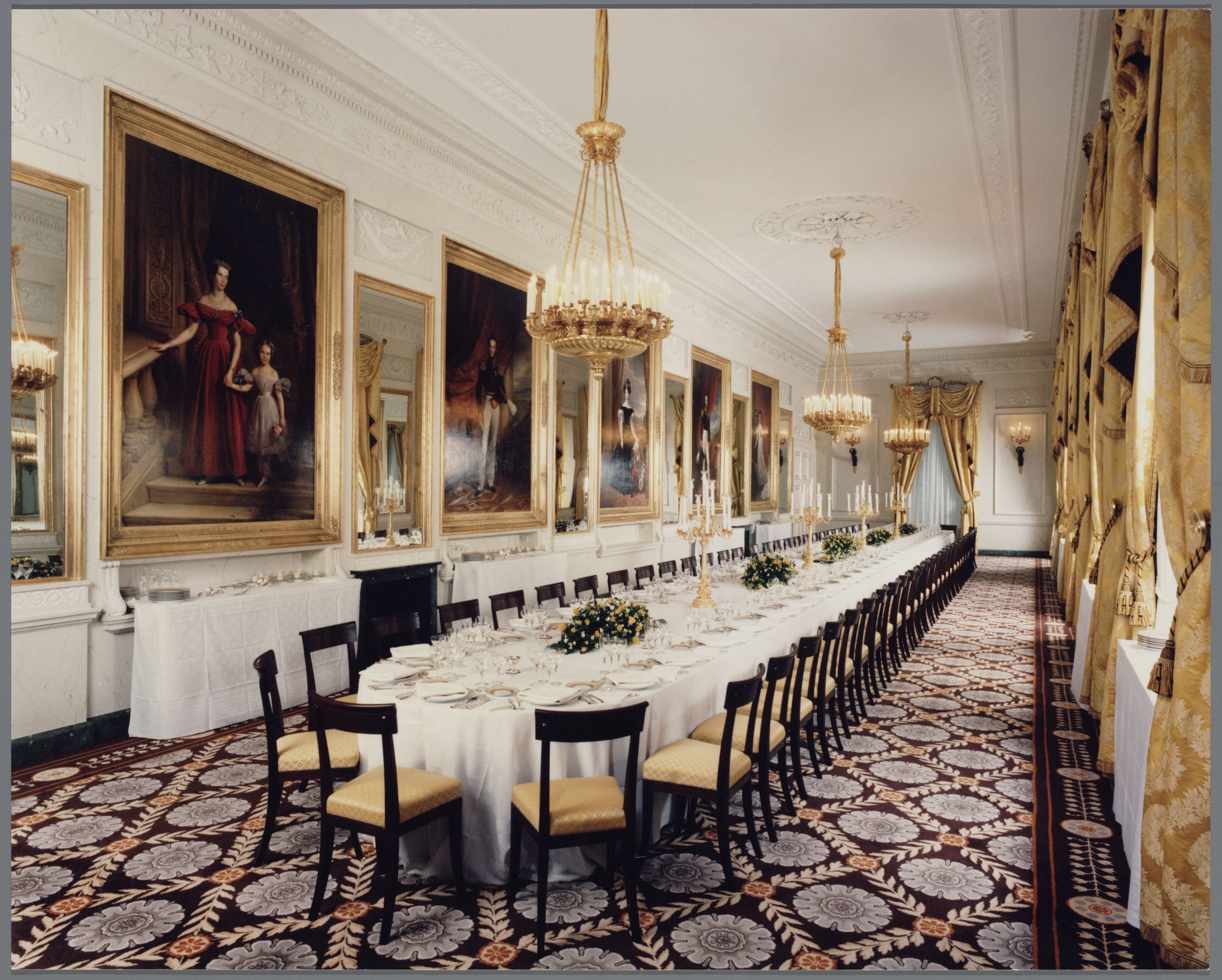
Gallery Room

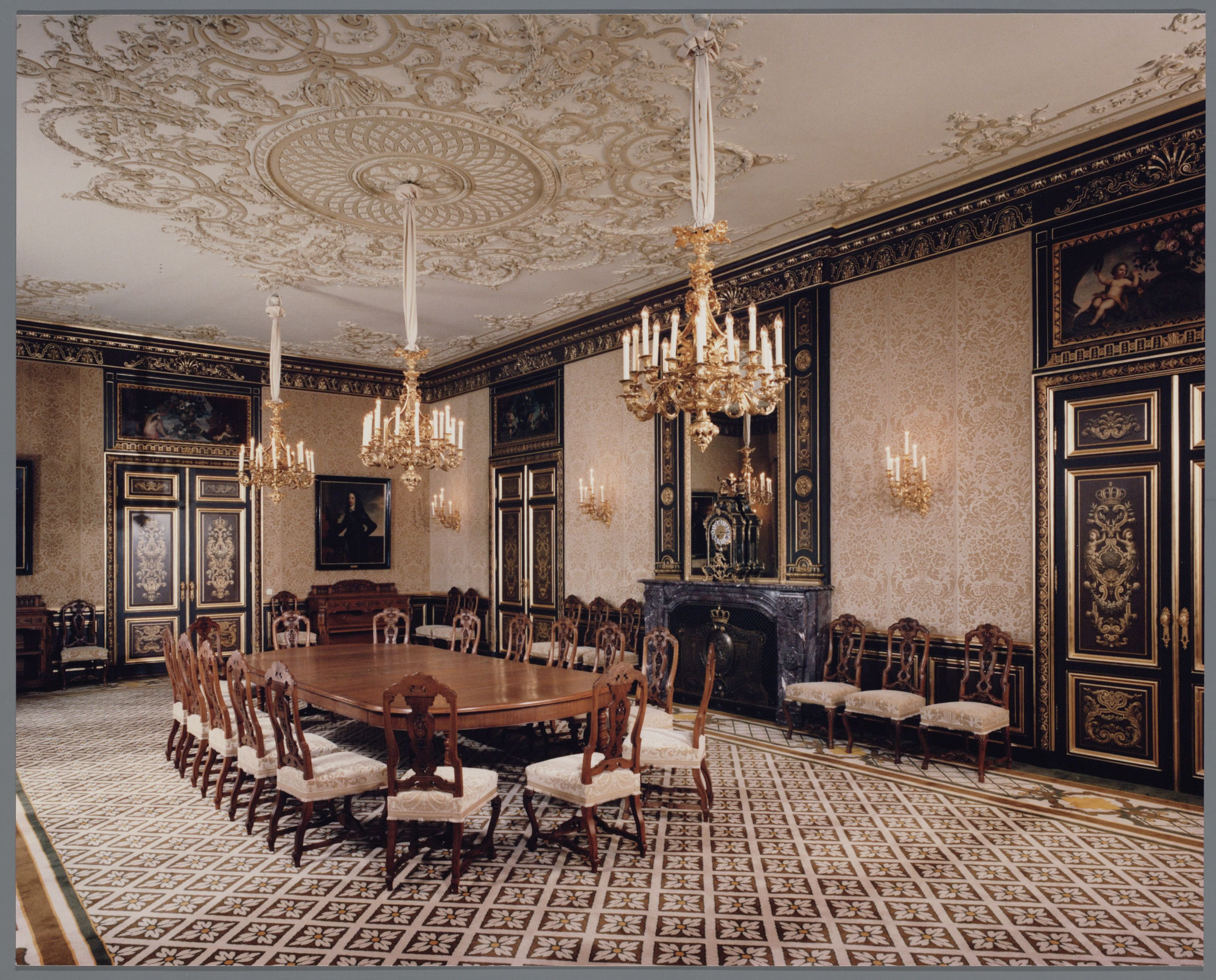
Marot Room

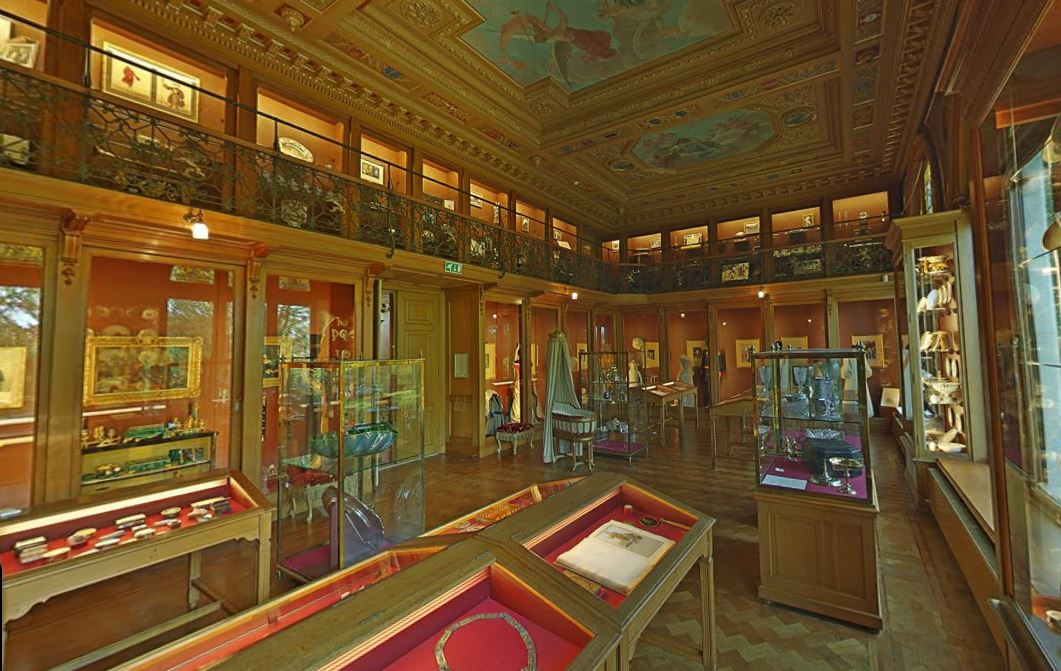
Koninklijk Huisarchief

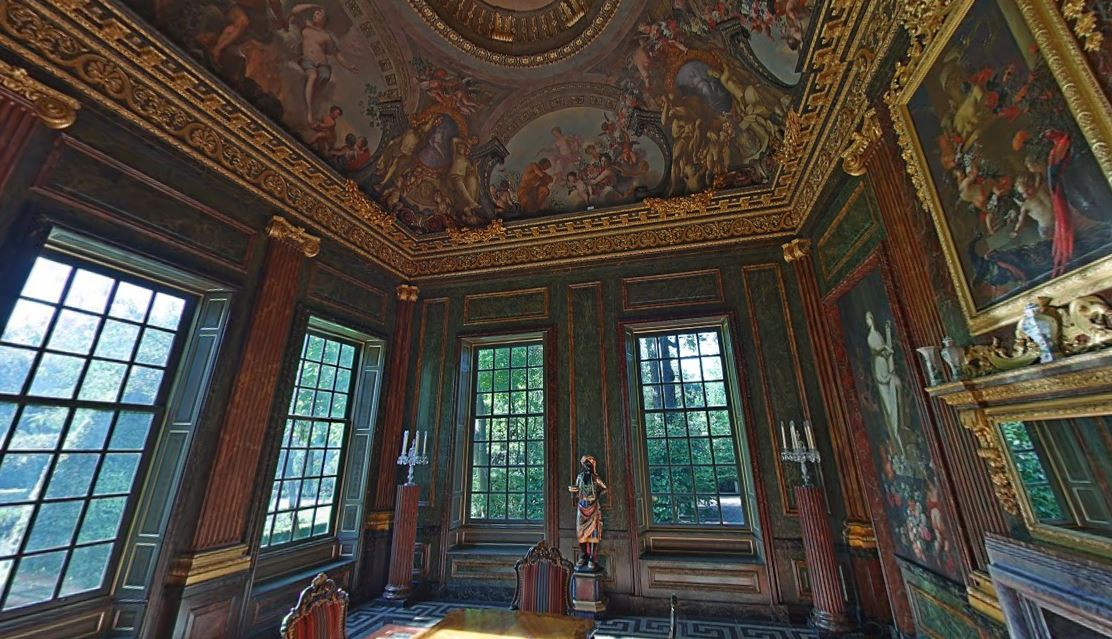
Koepel van Fagel

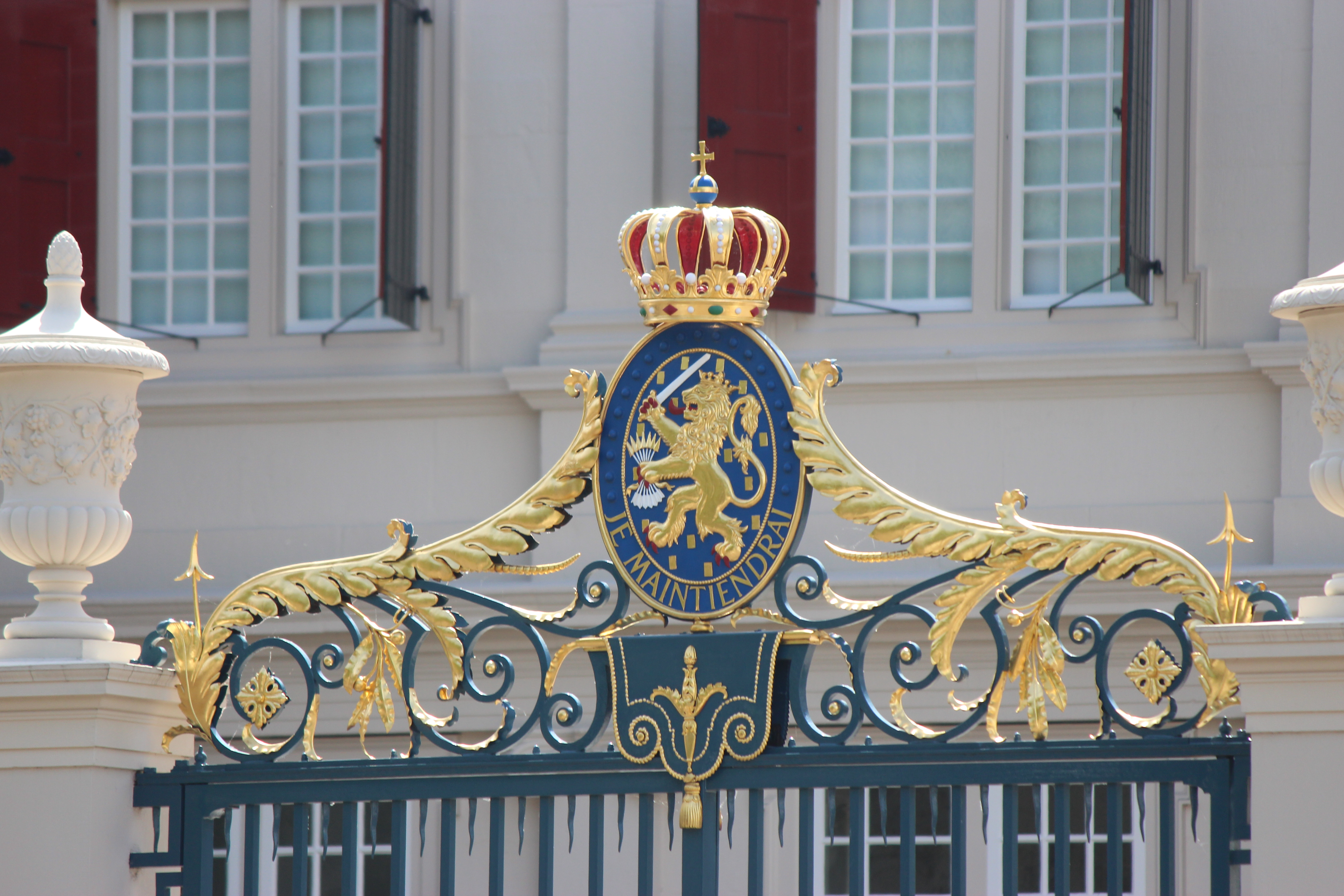
The royal coat of arms on the gate of the Noordeinde Palace in The Hague
