= Hand with Reflecting Sphere =

1935 lithograph by M. C. Escher

- Artist: M. C. Escher
- Year: 1935
- Type: Lithograph
- Dimensions: 31.8 cm × 21.3 cm (12.5 in × 8.4 in)

Hand with Reflecting Sphere, also known as Self-Portrait in Spherical Mirror, is a lithograph by Dutch artist M. C. Escher, first printed in January 1935. The piece depicts a hand holding a reflective sphere. In the reflection, most of the room around Escher can be seen, and the hand holding the sphere is revealed to be Escher's.

Self-portraits in reflective, spherical surfaces are common in Escher's work. In much of his self-portraiture of this type, Escher is in the act of drawing the sphere, whereas in this image he is seated and gazing into it. On the walls there are several framed pictures, one of which appears to be of an Indonesian shadow puppet.

== See also ==
- Alhazen's problem
- Still Life with Spherical Mirror
- Three Spheres II
- Lithography
- 1935 in art

== Sources ==
- Locher, J.L. (2000). The Magic of M. C. Escher. Harry N. Abrams, Inc. ISBN 0-8109-6720-0.
