= Another World (M. C. Escher) =

1947 woodcut print by M. C. Escher

Another World II
- Artist: M. C. Escher
- Year: 1947
- Type: woodcut
- Dimensions: 31.8 cm × 26.1 cm (12.5 in × 10.3 in)

Another World II, also known as Other World II, is a woodcut print by the Dutch artist M. C. Escher first printed in January 1947.

It depicts a cubic architectural structure made from brick. The structure is a paradox with an open archway on each of the five visible sides of the cube. The structure wraps around the vertical axis to enclose the viewer's perspective. At the bottom of the image is an archway from which we seem to be looking up from the base, and through it we can see space. At the top of that arch is another arch which is level with our perspective, and through it we are looking out over a lunar horizon. At the top of that arch is another arch which covers the top of the image. We are looking down at this arch from above and through it onto the lunar surface.

Standing in each archway along the vertical axis is a metal sculpture of a bird with a humanoid face. In each side archway is a horn or cornucopia hanging on chains. The views from above and below are consistent, placing the statue so that it faces the horn; however, the horizontal view reverses the relative positions of the statue and the horn, and rotates the horn 180 degrees.

The three "birds" and three windows with horns hanging in them are not symmetrically arrayed as they might be if they depicted three mutually orthogonal vertical orientations. As is, the open wall we are looking through opens into a space with three different vertical orientations, but two of them are opposites of each other. Presumably, behind the picture's overall point of view, the same landscape continues behind the viewer in the same orientation as we see it through the window opposite. Of course, from the point of view of the bird at the bottom, we are looking up from the floor, and from the point of view of the bird at the top, we are looking down through an open roof. Note that this asymmetry requires a further asymmetry to account for the fact that our point of view is not obviously that of another bird. In one wall, two windows and horns with opposite vertical orientation share the same wall. On the opposite wall, there is only one window with a horn, which shares the verticality of the overall picture and of the bird opposite. Thus, if the point of view of the drawing is that of another bird, there are four birds and three horns, with one of them being shared between two birds with the same vertical orientation. In order to portray three mutually orthogonal verticalities from the point of view of a third bird, the bird opposite that would have to be rotated 90 degrees, and the window adjacent to the viewer shows the naturally oriented landscape behind the hanging horn.

The previous month (December 1946), Escher created a mezzotint called Another World (Other World Gallery). The image in that print is the same as this one except that the arches continue on as an infinite corridor.

The bird/human sculpture is a real sculpture which was given to Escher by his father-in-law. This sculpture first appears in Escher's 1934 lithograph Still Life with Spherical Mirror.

The picture is featured on the cover of the 1965 edition of Italo Calvino's Cosmicomics.

== Sources ==
- Locher, J. L. (2000). The Magic of M. C. Escher. Harry N. Abrams, Inc. ISBN 978-0-8109-6720-5.
