= Snakes (M. C. Escher) =

1969 print by M. C. Escher

- Artist: M. C. Escher
- Year: 1969
- Type: woodcut
- Dimensions: 49.8 cm × 44.7 cm (19.6 in × 17.6 in)

Snakes is a woodcut print by the Dutch artist M. C. Escher. The work was first printed in July 1969, and was Escher's last print before his death.

Snakes depicts a disc made up of interlocking circles that grow progressively smaller towards the center and towards the edge. There are three snakes laced through the edge of the disc. The image is printed in three colours: green, orange and black. The use of snakes and the color palette of this composition recalls an earlier woodcut by the artist, Möbius Strip I (1960).

The print has rotational symmetry of order 3, comprising a single wedge-shaped image repeated three times in a circle. This means that it was printed from three blocks that were rotated on a pin to make three impressions each. Close inspection reveals the central mark left by the pin.

In several earlier works Escher explored the limits of infinitesimal size and infinite number, for example the Circle Limit series, by actually carrying through the rendering of smaller and smaller figures to the smallest possible sizes. By contrast, in Snakes, the infinite diminution of size – and infinite increase in number – is only suggested in the finished work. Nevertheless, the print shows very clearly how this rendering would have been carried out to the limits of human visibility.
