= Lange Voorhout Palace =

Palace in the Hague, Netherlands

Coordinates: 52.0833°N 4.3138°E

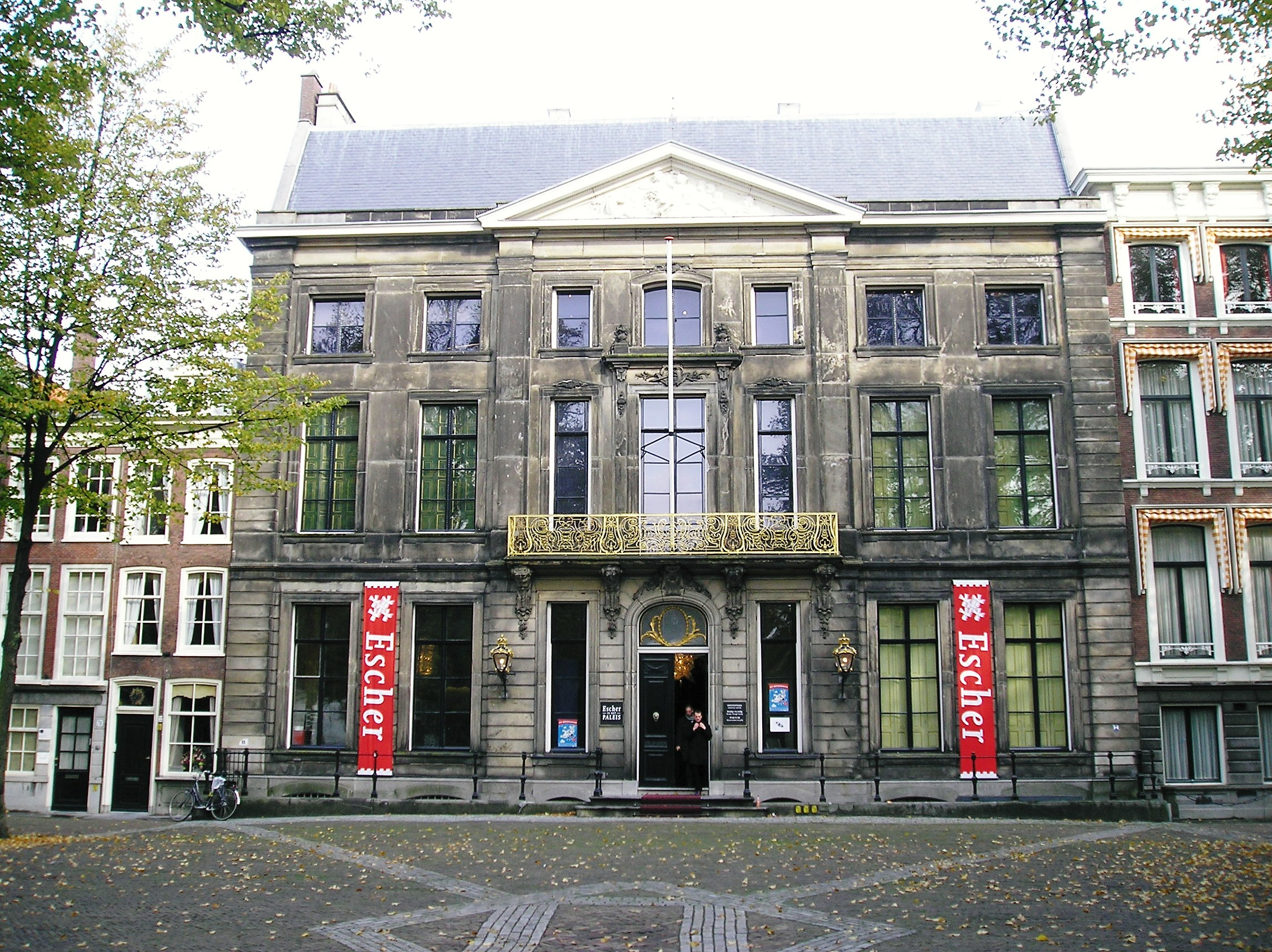
Lange Voorhout Palace in The Hague

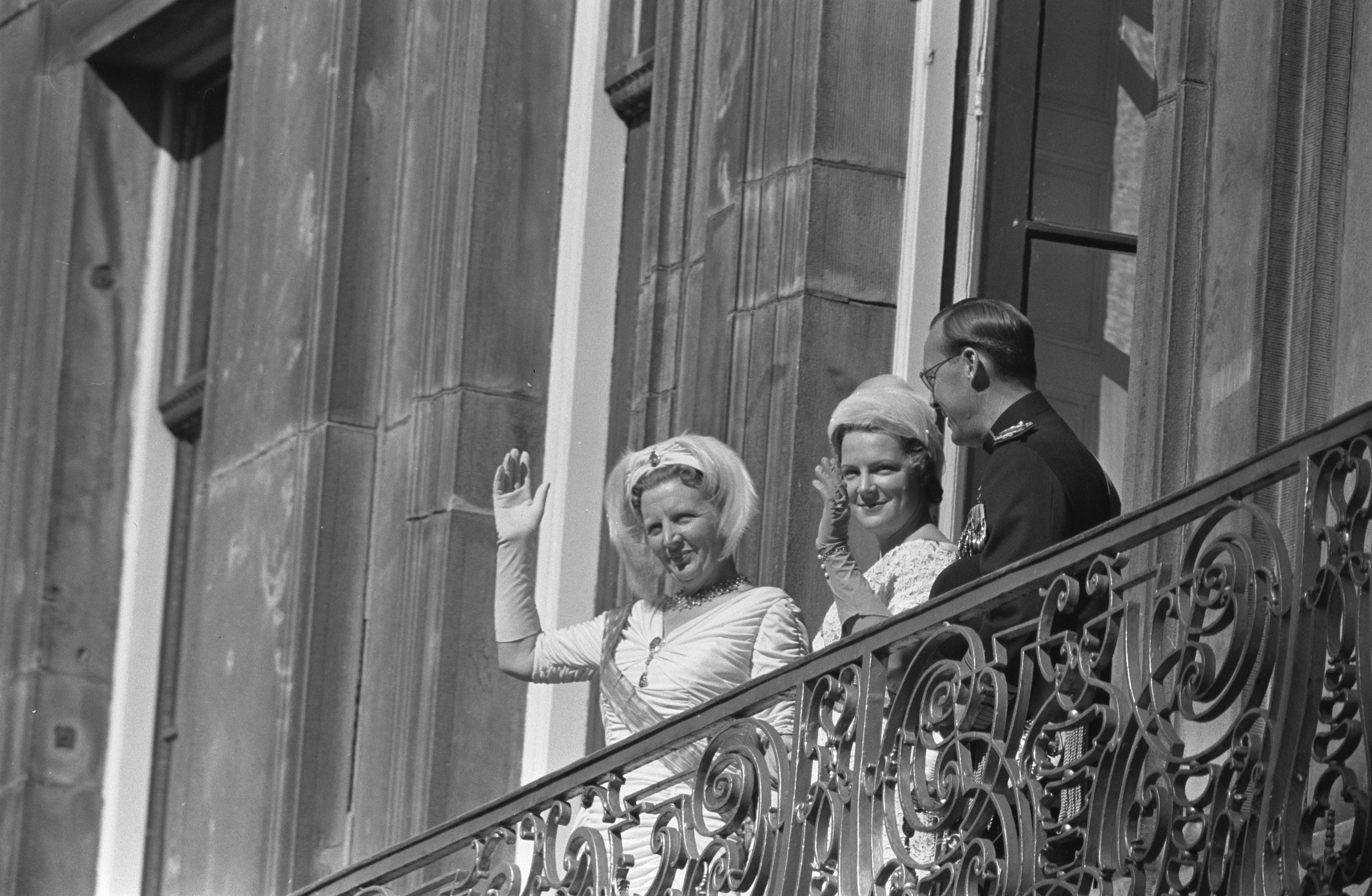
Queen Juliana, Princess Irene, and Prince Bernhard at the balcony of the palace on Prinsjesdag (1959)

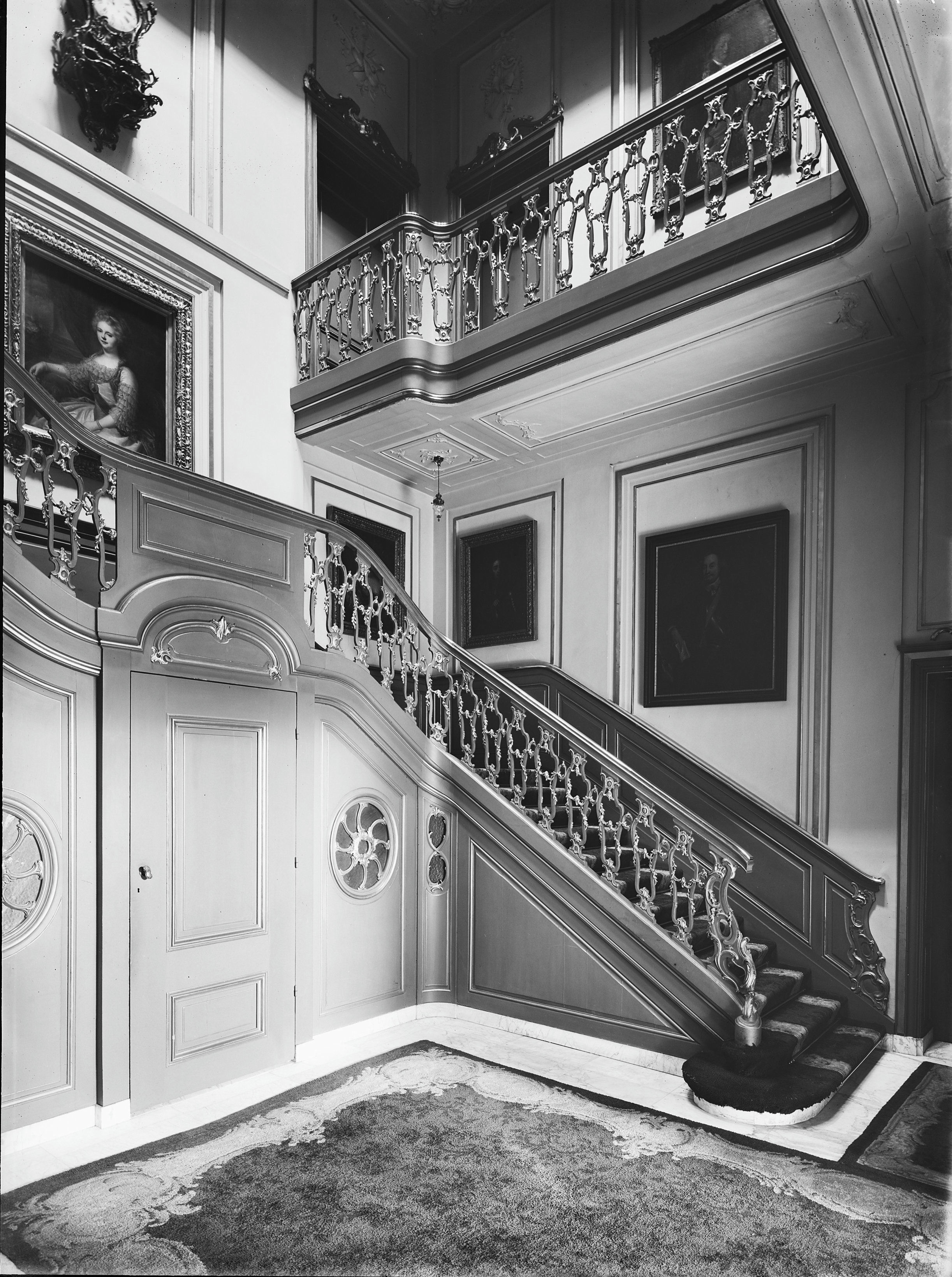
Main staircase (1937)

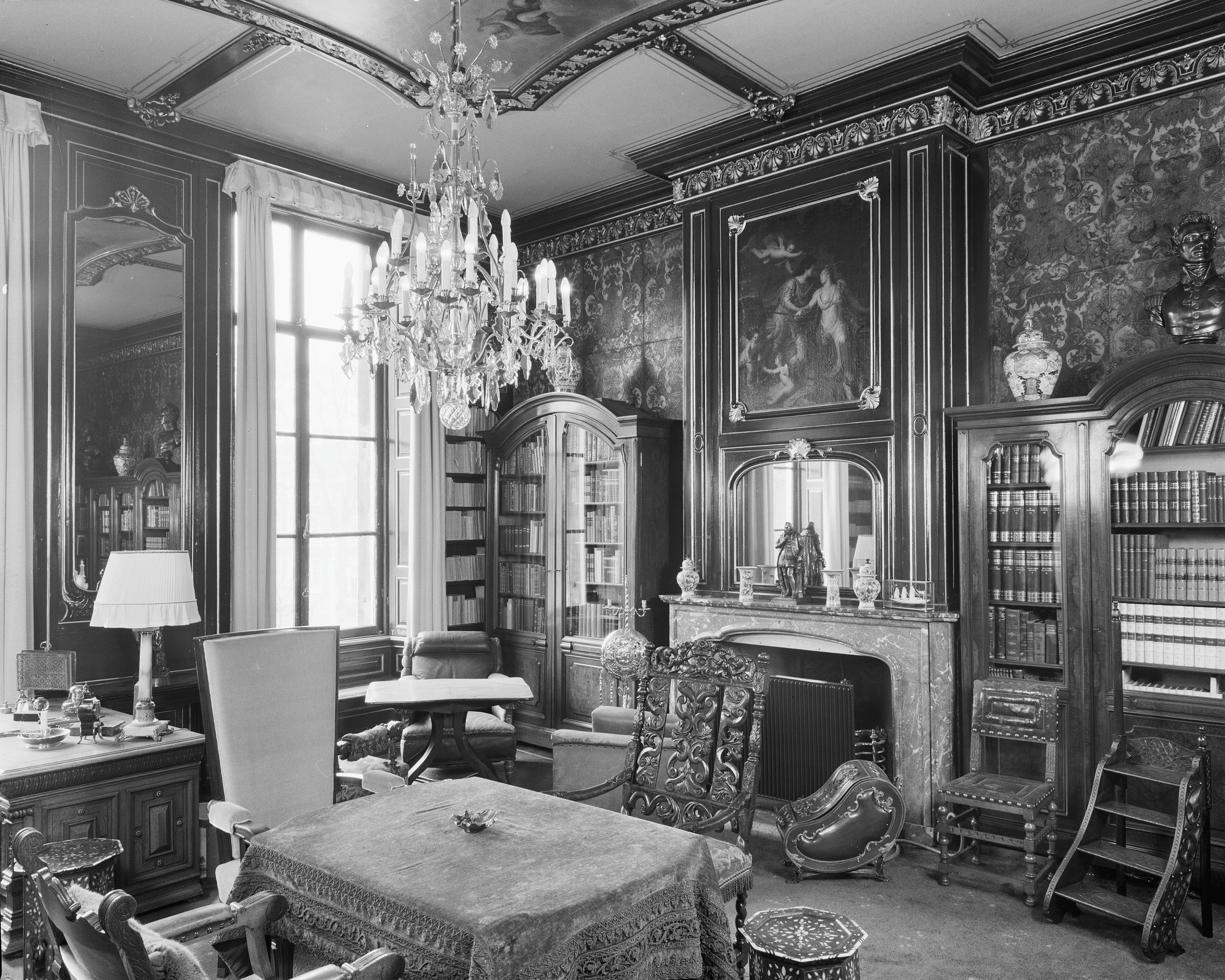
The left antechamber, on the middle floor (1967)

Lange Voorhout Palace (Dutch: Paleis Lange Voorhout [paːˈlɛis ˈlɑŋə voːrˈɦʌut]) in The Hague was designed in 1760 by the architect Pieter de Swart for Anthony Patras (1718-1764), a deputy to the States General of the Netherlands.

== History ==
Patras, born in Grenoble, France, was a nephew of governor Abraham Patras. In 1729 and under the advice of his uncle, Anthony was sent to Geneva to study. He left Geneva for Amsterdam in December 1733. In 1734 Anthony arrived in Batavia, Dutch East Indies. When his uncle, the governor, died in 1737 the young man inherited his immense fortune, the collection of books, and art. In 1738 he married a daughter of Isaac van Schinne, member of the Council of India. After the 1740 Batavia massacre he returned to the Dutch Republic. In 1743 he tried to become a member of Sloten's vroedschap, which refused to appoint him. After two years he suddenly became burgomaster of the Frisian town, succeeding Onno Zwier van Haren. He was a States General representative for this small city until his early death. (In Wijckel he bought Meerenstein which was built for Menno van Coehoorn.) Patras died early and probably hardly lived in his new house on Lange Voorhout. His widow was forced to sell the property in 1778 and in the next years it had three different owners.

In 1796 the mansion was bought by Archibald Hope (1747-1821), a manager of the Dutch West India Company. Archibald was a cousin of Henry Hope and Jan Hope and involved in the family banking business. In 1808 his wife died. Napoleon and his wife on their travels through the First French Empire used it one night. The inventory was sold in December 1821 and lasted more than two weeks. The building was bought by Reynoud Diederik Jacob van Reede, 7th Earl of Athlone (1773–1823), married to a daughter of John Williams Hope.

In 1831 the Minister of Foreign Affairs Johan Gijsbert Verstolk van Soelen (1776-1845) moved in. He had an enormous collection of Dutch art which was sold after his death.

=== Royal residence ===
In 1848 it was bought by Prince Henry. After his death in 1879 his widow Princess Marie of Prussia used the palace and probably lived there till 1885.

Princess Sophie of the Netherlands inherited the palace and in 1896 Queen Emma bought it from her sister-in-law. She had it renovated and rebuilt before moving into the palace in 1901. Like Prince Henry, Queen Mother Emma used the palace as a winter palace; in the summer she stayed at Soestdijk Palace.

The palace was used as an office for Wilhelmina, Juliana and till 1984 for Beatrix. Queen Juliana was the first queen to start the riding tour of the Golden Carriage from the palace at the opening of the States General on Prince's Day. In 1991, Princess Juliana sold the building to the municipality of The Hague on condition that it would only be used for cultural activities.

The Kunstumuseum (then called the Gemeentemuseum) used the palace for exhibitions, for example related to the works of Rodin, Venetian glass and Frida Kahlo. Since November 2002, the mansion has been used to exhibit the permanent M.C. Escher collection under the name of Escher in Het Paleis.
