= Escher Interactive =

1996 video game

- Developer: Eyeware Interactive
- Publishers: Byron Preiss, Harry N. Abrams Inc.
- Platform: Windows
- Release: 1996
- Genre: Educational
- Mode: Single-player

Escher Interactive is a 1996 video game developed by Eyeware Interactive and published by Byron Preiss and Harry N. Abrams Inc.. The game is the first software title to be based on the work of Dutch artist M.C. Escher. It features a gallery of Escher's work and a timeline of his life, as well as animations of his work, interactive games and a program for creating tessellations. Upon release, the software received praise for its game modes, although some criticism for its lack of text accompaniment or context as a resource on Escher's biography and works.

== Gameplay ==
The Tessellation Workshop mode allows users to create tessellation-based patterns inspired by Escher works.

Escher Interactive includes various visual and interactive modes, which users select from the main menu. The game contains a brief pictorial biography with audio voiceover, also featuring short videos of interviews with Escher's son, George Escher. The disk contains an art gallery in which over 600 of Escher's illustrations can be browsed in chronological order. Works can be viewed in chronological, selective or random order, with a search function allowing users to search for works by name, theme or object. In The Animated Escher, six animations based on Escher works are featured, including those based on his Möbius Band series. Spheres allows the player to view several Escher works, with the cursor featuring a circular lens that slightly distorts the image.

The disc also features three interactive tools and games: in Tessellation Workshop, users can edit interlocking mosaic patterns using a tool to modify nine of Escher's tessellations. Users can modify the patterns by bending the lines or altering the colors, and can save and print the images. Convex and Concave is a game in which players are presented with perspective puzzles., where the player is presented with a surface and must decide whether that surface is convex or concave by placing an item with a corresponding perspective into the correct position. The mode features a time limit and several difficulty modes. Impossible Puzzles is a 3D puzzle game, requiring players to assemble cubic puzzle pieces to imitate a complete shape onscreen.

== Development and release ==
Development of Escher Interactive began in 1994, led by executive producer Michael Chanowski and Henk Alles of Dutch development studio Eyeware Interactive. Puzzle designer and author Scott Kim, who developed the Impossible Puzzles game, stated the design was based on his previous puzzle title Heaven & Earth, basing several of the models from Escher works including the impossible cube and stairway. The game was developed in co-operation with the Escher estate, and published jointly with Byron Preiss and art publisher Harry N. Abrams Inc..

== Reception ==
Reception

Review scores
Publication	Score
Computer Gaming World	4/5
PC Review	5/10
PC World	4/5

Reviewers were mixed on the software's interactive media elements, with several praising the software modes, but others critiquing the user interface. Matthew Mirpaul of the New York Times stated the game was a "laudably comprehensive" catalog of Escher's output, and animated with "delightfully alive" representations of his work. Michael Greenberg of Computer Gaming World similarly said that the game had plenty of entertainment value, and the works were "presented with style" and the puzzles "nicely integrated into the presentation". James Daly of Wired enjoyed the puzzles, and considered they "illuminate the complexity of his spatial illusions". However, Harold Goldberg of The New York Times felt many aspects of the software didn't work, critiquing its "useless" and "simplistic" interactivity and unclear design between a game and reference tool.

Several critics felt the game lacked features, and was expensive for the software modes on offer. The digital biography was critiqued, with critics widely stating that the software could have had benefited from greater text accompaniment. Mirpaul considered the game lacked substance and "historical context for Escher's work" or his "role in art history", undermining its value as reference software. Stating the disc was "dull and uninspiring" despite some fun elements, PC Review critiqued the game's lack of features and basic image morphing, stating they had been done better before in other software.
