= Escher in The Palace =

Museum in the Netherlands

Escher in Het Paleis
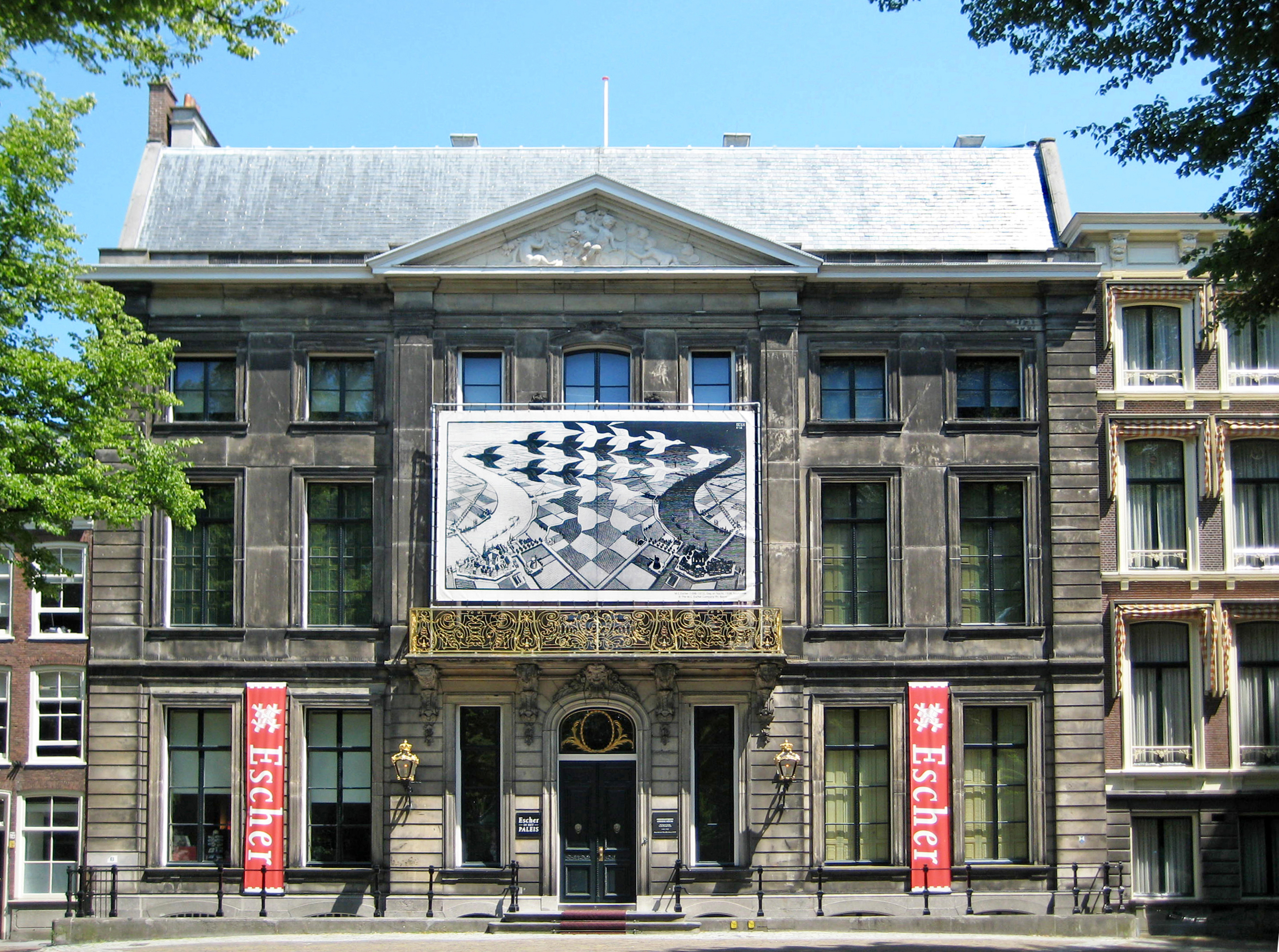
- Escher in Het Paleis, Lange Voorhout Palace, The Hague
- Established: 15 November 2002
- Location: The Hague, Netherlands
- Coordinates: 52.083333°N 4.314444°E
- Type: Art, prints, drawing museum
- Visitors: 150,000
- Director: Margriet Schavemaker
- Curator: Mireille Linck
- Public transit access: Tram line 15 or 16; Korte Voorhout
- Website: www.escherinhetpaleis.nl

Escher in Het Paleis (Escher in The Palace) is a museum in The Hague, Netherlands, featuring the works of the Dutch graphical artist M. C. Escher. It is housed in the Lange Voorhout Palace since November 2002.

== History ==
The museum is housed in the Lange Voorhout Palace, a former royal residence dating back to the eighteenth century. Queen Emma bought the stately house in 1896. She used it as a winter palace from March 1901 until her death in March 1934. It was used by four subsequent Dutch queens for their business offices, until Queen Beatrix moved the office to Paleis Noordeinde. The first and second floors have exhibitions showing the royal period of the palace, highlighting Queen Emma's residence.

The museum features a permanent display of a large number of woodcuts and lithographs by M.C. Escher, among them the world-famous prints Sky and Water (birds become fish); Belvedere (the inside out of a Folly); Waterfall (where water seems to flow upwards); Drawing Hands (two hands drawing each other). Escher in Het Paleis shows the early lovely Italian landscapes, the many mirror prints and a choice from his many tessellation drawings. Also the three versions of the Metamorphosis, from the first small one, to the third, of 7 meters. This one is shown in a circle, creating an endless version. It underlines the new vision of the museum on the work of M.C. Escher.

The third floor of the museum is dedicated to the Optical Illusion, besides the famous Escher Room in which grownups seem to be smaller than their children, one's eyes will be tricked by multiple interactive displays.

== Interior ==
In the rooms of the museum are fifteen chandeliers made by the Rotterdam artist Hans van Bentem. The artist designed these especially for the museum, with some references to the work of Escher and the palace. In the ballroom, a star chandelier is endlessly reflected in the two mirrors. In other rooms there are chandeliers such as a shark, a skull, spiders, and a sea horse.

The parquet floor in the palace was designed in 1991/92 by the American minimal artist Donald Judd on the occasion of the opening of the former royal palace as an exhibition palace. Judd applied the principle of different colours and geometric patterns to the parquet floor in the palace.

== Controversy ==
In 2015 it was revealed that many of the prints on display at the museum were replicas, scanned from original prints and printed onto the same type of paper used by Escher, rather than original Escher prints as they had been labeled.

== See also ==
- List of single-artist museums
