= Friedrich Haag (crystallographer) =

German crystallographer (1856–1941)

Friedrich Haag (20 August 1856 – 8 December 1941) was a pioneering German crystallographer.

An article written by Haag in the Zeitschrift für Kristallographie (a German crystallography journal) was used by M. C. Escher in his study of tessellation.
