= Still Life with Spherical Mirror =

Print by M. C. Escher

- Artist: M. C. Escher
- Year: 1934
- Type: Lithography
- Dimensions: 28.6 cm × 32.6 cm (11.3 in × 12.8 in)

Still Life with Spherical Mirror is a lithography print by the Dutch artist M. C. Escher first printed in November 1934. It depicts a setting with rounded bottle and a metal sculpture of a bird with a human face seated atop a newspaper and a book. The background is dark, but in the bottle can be seen the reflection of Escher's studio and Escher himself sketching the scene.

Self-portraits in reflective spherical surfaces can be found in Escher's early ink drawings and in his prints as late as the 1950s. The metal bird/human sculpture is real and was given to Escher by his father-in-law. This sculpture appears again in Escher's later prints Another World Mezzotint (Other World Gallery) (1946) and Another World (1947).

== See also ==
- Printmaking

== Sources ==
- Locher, J. L. (2000). The Magic of M. C. Escher. Harry N. Abrams, Inc. ISBN 0-8109-6720-0.
