= M. C. Escher =

Dutch graphic artist (1898–1972)

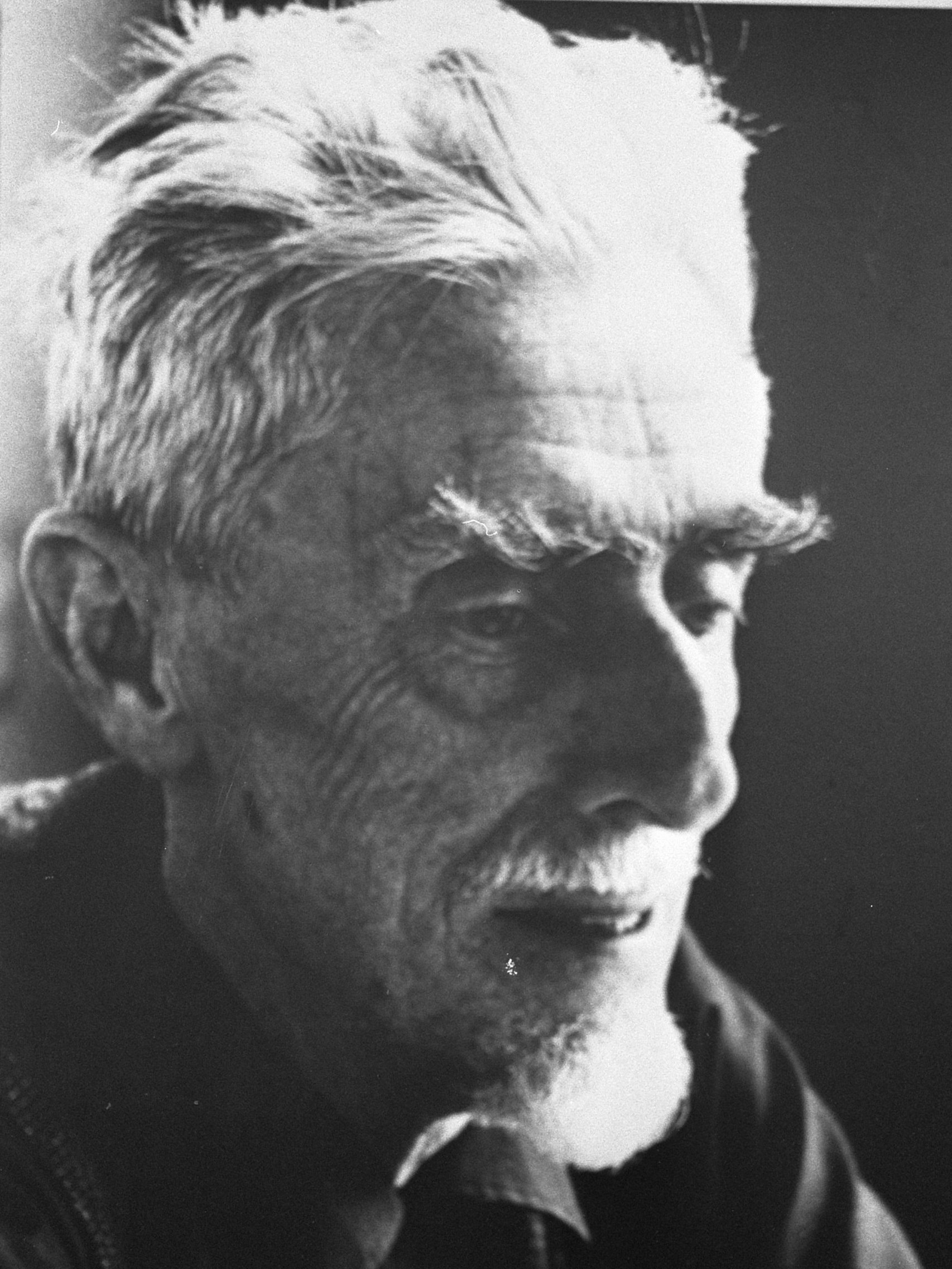
- Escher in 1971
- Born: Maurits Cornelis Escher; 17 June 1898; Leeuwarden, Netherlands
- Died: 27 March 1972 (aged 73); Hilversum, Netherlands
- Resting place: Baarn, Netherlands
- Other name: Mauk
- Education: Technical College of Delft; Haarlem School of Architecture and Decorative Arts
- Known for: Drawing; printmaking
- Notable work: Hand with Reflecting Sphere (1935); Drawing Hands (1948); Relativity (1953); Waterfall (1961)
- Spouse: Jetta Umiker (m. 1924)
- Children: 3
- Father: George Arnold Escher
- Relatives: Berend George, half-brother
- Awards: Knight (1955) and Officer (1967) of the Order of Orange-Nassau
- Website: mcescher.com

Maurits Cornelis Escher (/ˈɛʃər/; Dutch: [ˈmʌurɪts kɔrˈneːlɪs ˈɛɕər]; 17 June 1898 – 27 March 1972) was a Dutch graphic artist who made woodcuts, lithographs, and mezzotints, many of which were inspired by mathematics. Despite wide popular interest, for most of his life Escher was neglected in the art world, even in his native Netherlands. He was 70 before a retrospective exhibition was held. In the late twentieth century, he became more widely appreciated, and in the twenty-first century he has been celebrated in exhibitions around the world.

His work features mathematical objects and operations including impossible objects, explorations of infinity, reflection, symmetry, perspective, truncated and stellated polyhedra, hyperbolic geometry, and tessellations. Although Escher believed he had no mathematical ability, he interacted with the mathematicians George Pólya, Roger Penrose, and Donald Coxeter, and the crystallographer Friedrich Haag, and conducted his own research into tessellation.

Early in his career, he drew inspiration from nature, making studies of insects, landscapes, and plants such as lichens, all of which he used as details in his artworks. He traveled in Italy and Spain, sketching buildings, townscapes, architecture and the tilings of the Alhambra and the Mezquita of Cordoba, and became steadily more interested in their mathematical structure.

Escher's art became well known among scientists and mathematicians, and in popular culture, especially after it was featured by Martin Gardner in his April 1966 Mathematical Games column in Scientific American. Apart from being used in a variety of technical papers, his work has appeared on the covers of many books and albums. He was one of the major inspirations for Douglas Hofstadter's Pulitzer Prize–winning 1979 book Gödel, Escher, Bach.

== Early life ==
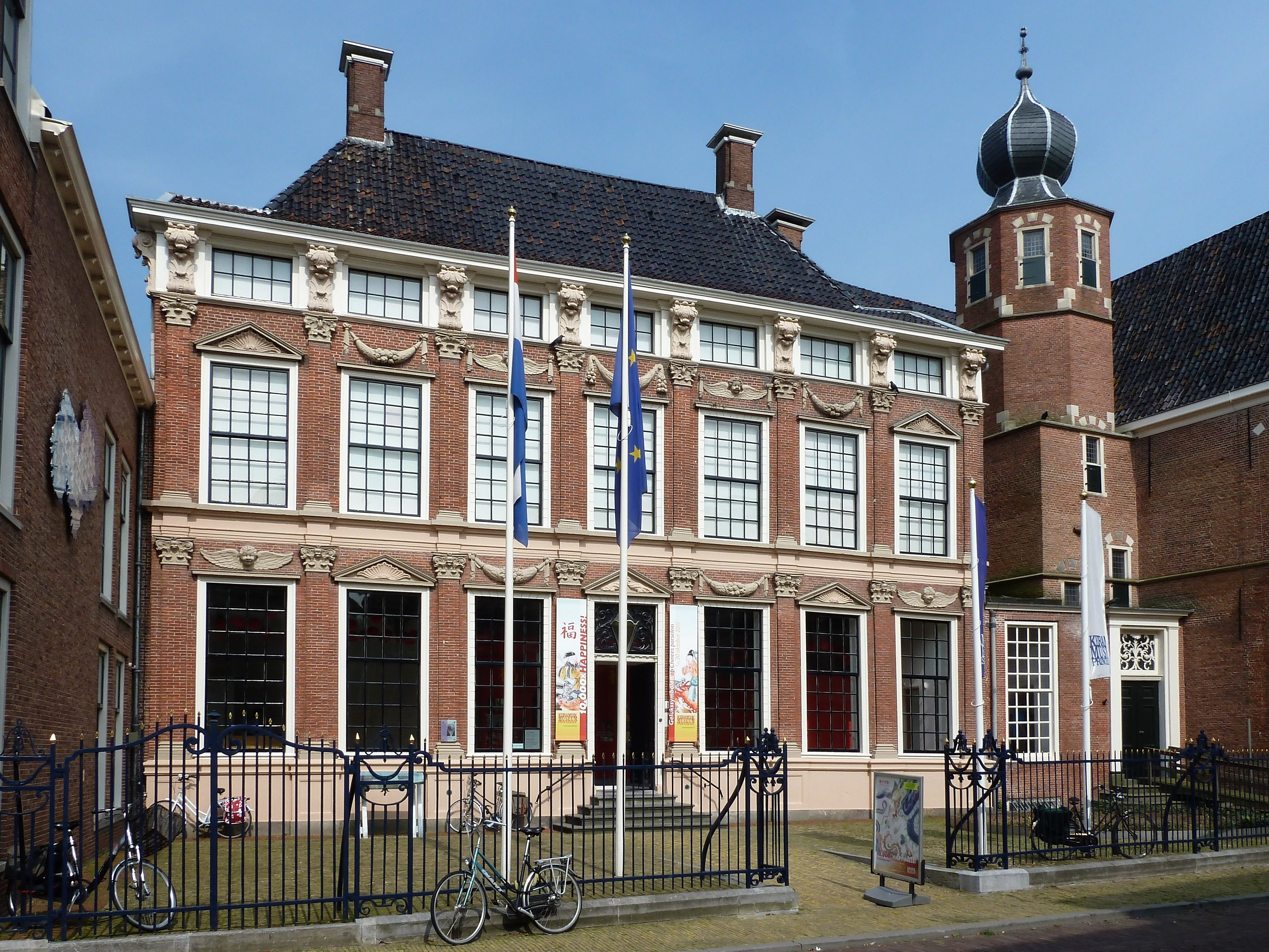
Escher's birth house, now part of the Princessehof Ceramics Museum, in Leeuwarden, Friesland, the Netherlands

Maurits Cornelis (Note: "We named him Maurits Cornelis after S.'s [Sara's] beloved uncle Van Hall, and called him 'Mauk' for short ...", Diary of Escher's father, quoted in M. C. Escher: His Life and Complete Graphic Work, Abradale Press, 1981, p. 9.) Escher was born on 17 June 1898 in Leeuwarden, Friesland, the Netherlands, in a house that forms part of the Princessehof Ceramics Museum today. He was the youngest son of the civil engineer George Arnold Escher and his second wife, Sara Gleichman. In 1903, the family moved to Arnhem, where he attended primary and secondary school until 1918. Known to his friends and family as "Mauk", he was a sickly child and was placed in a special school at the age of seven; he failed the second grade. Although he excelled at drawing, his grades were generally poor. He took carpentry and piano lessons until he was thirteen years old.

In 1918, he went to the Technical College of Delft. From 1919 to 1922, Escher attended the Haarlem School of Architecture and Decorative Arts, learning drawing and the art of making woodcuts. He briefly studied architecture, but he failed a number of subjects (due partly to a persistent skin infection) and switched to decorative arts, studying under the graphic artist Samuel Jessurun de Mesquita.

== Study journeys ==
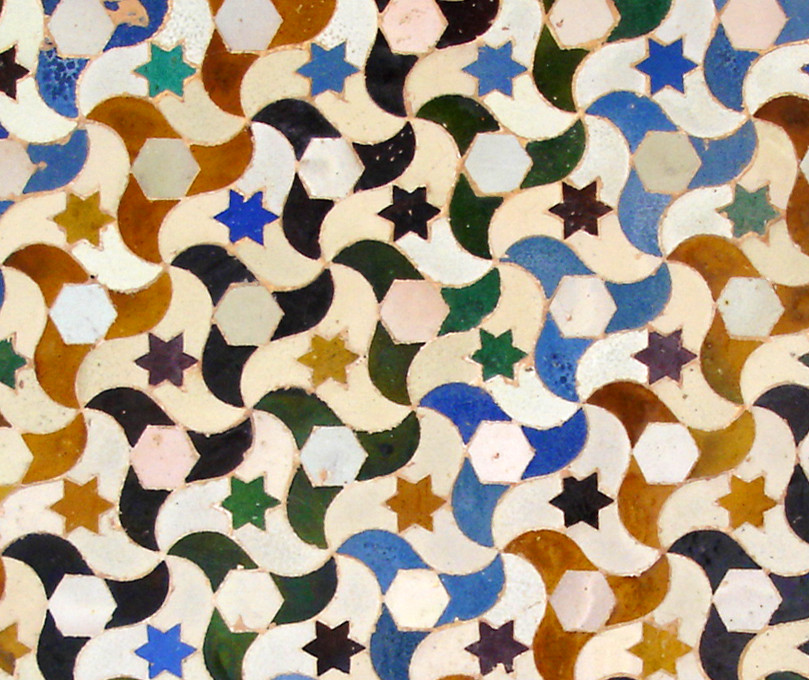
Moorish tessellations including this one at the Alhambra inspired Escher's work with tilings of the plane. He made sketches of this and other Alhambra patterns in 1936.

In 1922, an important year of his life, Escher traveled through Italy, visiting Florence, San Gimignano, Volterra, Siena, and Ravello. In the same year, he traveled through Spain, visiting Madrid, Toledo, and Granada. He was impressed by the Italian countryside and, in Granada, by the Moorish architecture of the fourteenth-century Alhambra. The intricate decorative designs of the Alhambra, based on geometrical symmetries featuring interlocking repetitive patterns in the coloured tiles or sculpted into the walls and ceilings, triggered his interest in the mathematics of tessellation and became a powerful influence on his work.

Escher's painstaking (Note: The circled cross at the top of the image may indicate that the drawing is inverted, as can be seen by comparison with the photograph; the neighbouring image has a circled cross at the bottom. It is likely that Escher turned the drawing block, as convenient, while holding it in his hand in the Alhambra.) study of the same Moorish tiling in the Alhambra, 1936, demonstrates his growing interest in tessellation.

Escher returned to Italy and lived in Rome from 1923 to 1935. While in Italy, Escher met Jetta Umiker – a Swiss woman, like himself attracted to Italy – whom he married in 1924. The couple settled in Rome where their first son, Giorgio (George) Arnaldo Escher, named after his grandfather, was born. Escher and Jetta later had two more sons – Arthur and Jan.

He travelled frequently, visiting (among other places) Viterbo in 1926, the Abruzzi in 1927 and 1929, Corsica in 1928 and 1933, Calabria in 1930, the Amalfi coast in 1931 and 1934, and Gargano and Sicily in 1932 and 1935. The townscapes and landscapes of these places feature prominently in his artworks. In May and June 1936, Escher travelled back to Spain, revisiting the Alhambra and spending days at a time making detailed drawings of its mosaic patterns. It was here that he became fascinated, to the point of obsession, with tessellation, explaining:

It remains an extremely absorbing activity, a real mania to which I have become addicted, and from which I sometimes find it hard to tear myself away.

The sketches he made in the Alhambra formed a major source for his work from that time on. He studied the architecture of the Mezquita, the Moorish mosque of Cordoba. This turned out to be the last of his long study journeys; after 1937, his artworks were created in his studio rather than in the field. His art correspondingly changed sharply from being mainly observational, with a strong emphasis on the realistic details of things seen in nature and architecture, to being the product of his geometric analysis and his visual imagination. All the same, even his early work already shows his interest in the nature of space, the unusual, perspective, and multiple points of view.

== Later life ==
In 1935, the political climate in Italy under Mussolini became unacceptable to Escher. He had no interest in politics, finding it impossible to involve himself with any ideals other than the expressions of his own concepts through his own particular medium, but he was averse to fanaticism and hypocrisy. When his eldest son, George, was forced at the age of nine to wear a Ballila uniform in school, the family left Italy and moved to Château-d'Œx, Switzerland, where they remained for two years.

The Netherlands post office had Escher design a semi-postal stamp for the "Air Fund" (Dutch: Het Nationaal Luchtvaartfonds) in 1935, and again in 1949 he designed Dutch stamps. These were for the 75th anniversary of the Universal Postal Union; a different design was used by Suriname and the Netherlands Antilles for the same commemoration.

Escher, who had been very fond of and inspired by the landscapes in Italy, was decidedly unhappy in Switzerland. In 1937, the family moved again, to Uccle (Ukkel), a suburb of Brussels, Belgium. World War II forced them to move in January 1941, this time to Baarn, Netherlands, where Escher lived until 1970. Most of Escher's best-known works date from this period. The sometimes cloudy, cold, and wet weather of the Netherlands allowed him to focus intently on his work. After 1953, Escher lectured widely. A planned series of lectures in North America in 1962 was cancelled after an illness, and he stopped creating artworks for a time, but the illustrations and text for the lectures were later published as part of the book Escher on Escher. He was awarded the Knighthood of the Order of Orange-Nassau in 1955; in 1967, he was made an Officer.

In July 1969, he finished his last work, a large woodcut with threefold rotational symmetry called Snakes, (Note: See Snakes (M. C. Escher) article for image.) in which snakes wind through a pattern of linked rings. These shrink to infinity toward both the center and the edge of a circle. It was exceptionally elaborate, being printed using three blocks, each rotated three times about the center of the image and precisely aligned to avoid gaps and overlaps, for a total of nine print operations for each finished print. The image encapsulates Escher's love of symmetry; of interlocking patterns; and, at the end of his life, of his approach to infinity. The care that Escher took in creating and printing this woodcut can be seen in a video recording.

Escher moved to the Rosa Spier Huis in Laren in 1970, an artists' retirement home in which he had his own studio. He died in a hospital in Hilversum on 27 March 1972, aged 73. He is buried at the New Cemetery in Baarn.

== Mathematically inspired work ==
Much of Escher's work is inescapably mathematical. This has caused a disconnect between his fame among mathematicians and the general public, and the lack of esteem with which he has been viewed in the art world. His originality and mastery of graphic techniques are respected, but his works have been thought too intellectual and insufficiently lyrical. Movements such as conceptual art have, to a degree, reversed the art world's attitude to intellectuality and lyricism, but this did not rehabilitate Escher, because traditional critics still disliked his narrative themes and his use of perspective. However, these same qualities made his work highly attractive to the public.

Escher is not the first artist to explore mathematical themes: J. L. Locher, a previous director of the Kunstmuseum in The Hague, pointed out that Parmigianino (1503–1540) had explored spherical geometry and reflection in his 1524 Self-portrait in a Convex Mirror, depicting his own image in a curved mirror, while William Hogarth's 1754 Satire on False Perspective foreshadows Escher's playful exploration of errors in perspective. Another early artistic forerunner is Giovanni Battista Piranesi (1720–1778), whose dark "fantastical" prints such as The Drawbridge in his Carceri ("Prisons") sequence depict perspectives of complex architecture with many stairs and ramps, peopled by walking figures. Escher greatly admired Piranesi and had several of Piranesi's prints hanging in his studio.

Only with 20th century movements such as Cubism, De Stijl, Dadaism, and Surrealism did mainstream art start to explore Escher-like ways of looking at the world with multiple simultaneous viewpoints. However, although Escher had much in common with, for example, Magritte's surrealism and Op art, he did not make contact with any of these movements.

Forerunners of Escher identified by J. L. Locher

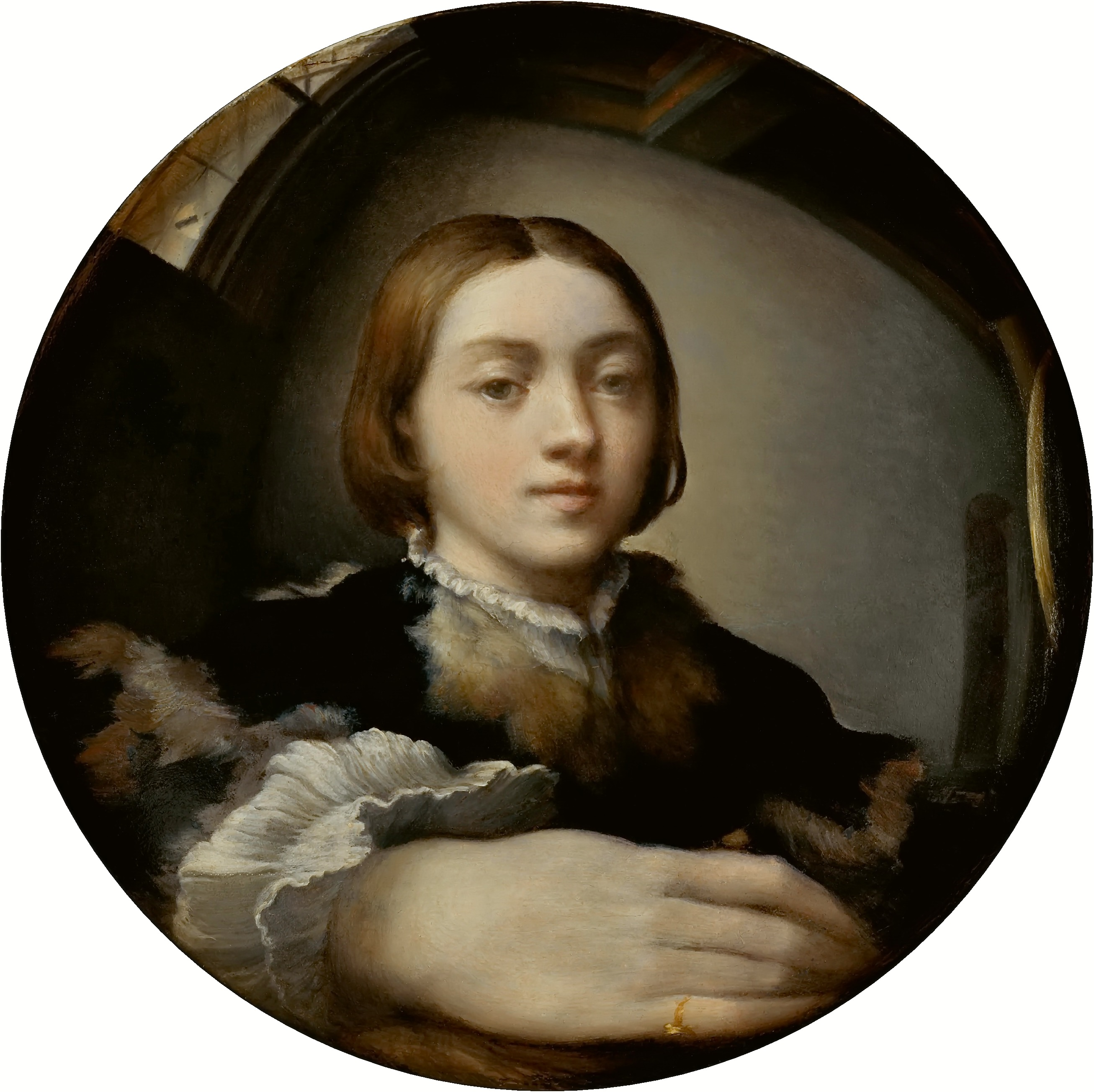
Forerunner of Escher's curved perspectives, geometries, and reflections: Parmigianino's Self-portrait in a Convex Mirror, 1524

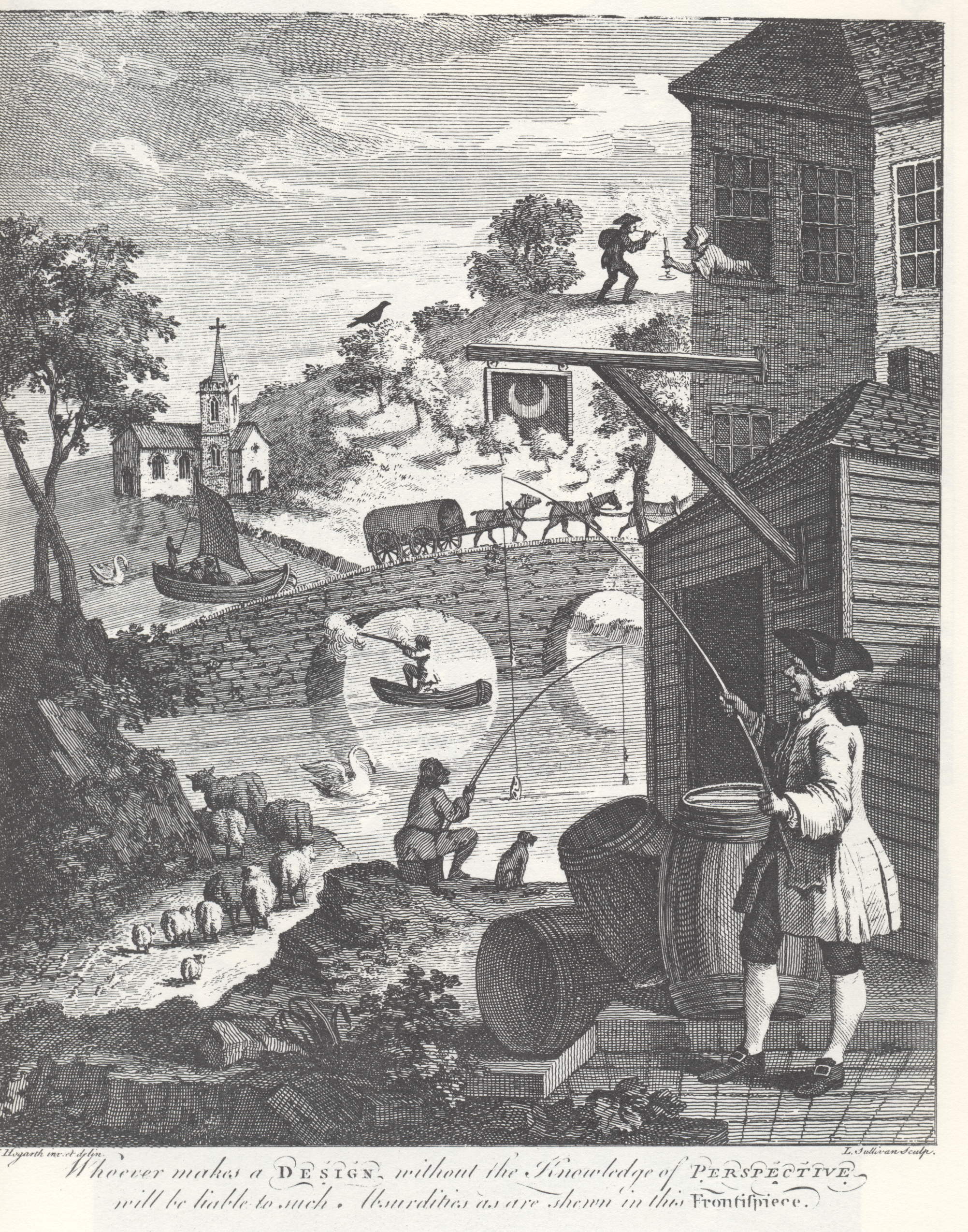
Forerunner of Escher's impossible perspectives: William Hogarth's Satire on False Perspective, 1753

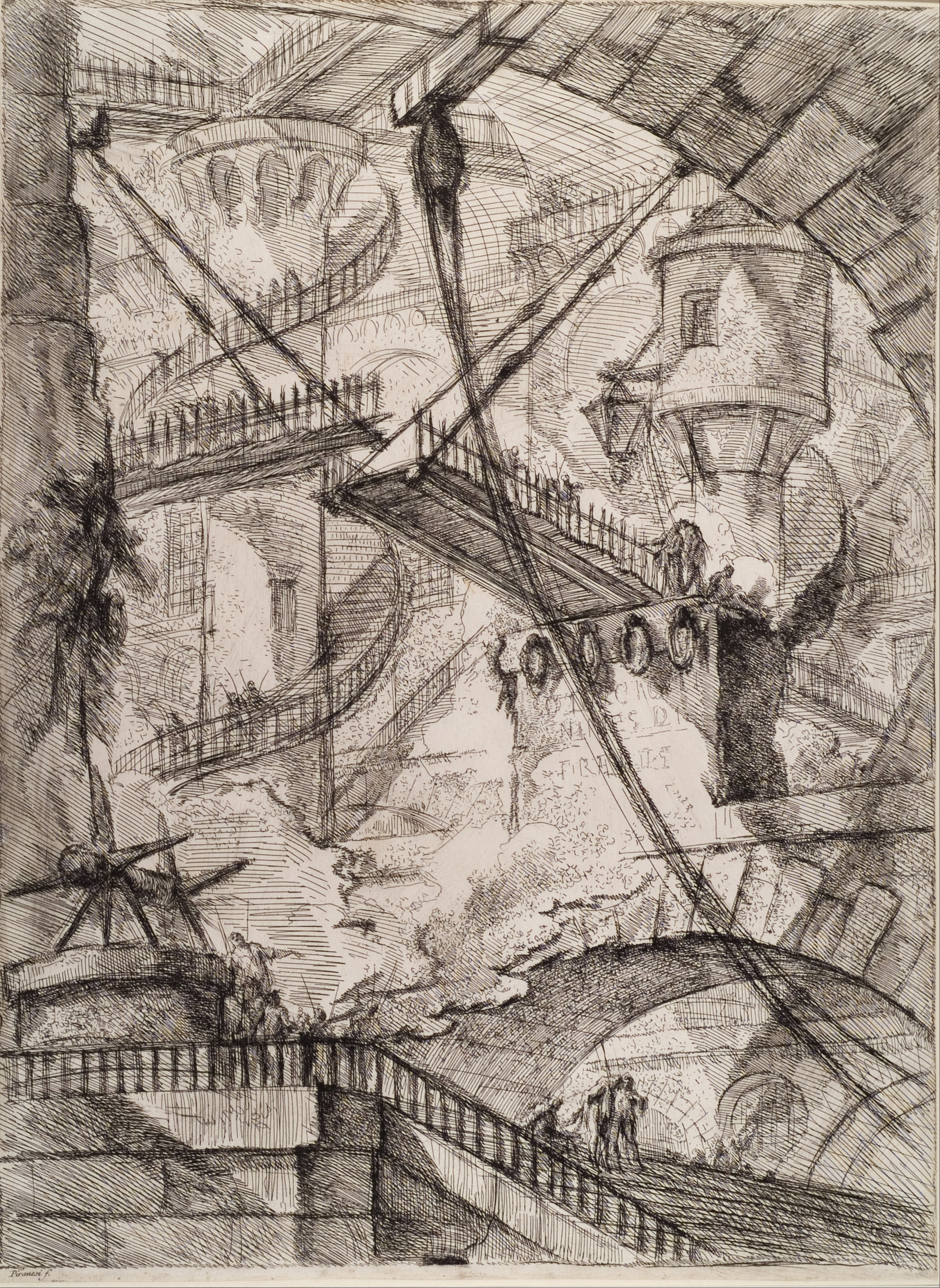
Forerunner of Escher's fantastic endless stairs: Piranesi's Carceri Plate VII – The Drawbridge, 1745, reworked 1761

=== Tessellation ===
In his early years, Escher sketched landscapes and nature. He sketched insects such as ants, bees, grasshoppers, and mantises, which appeared frequently in his later work. His early love of Roman and Italian landscapes and of nature created an interest in tessellation, which he called Regular Division of the Plane; this became the title of his 1958 book, complete with reproductions of a series of woodcuts based on tessellations of the plane, in which he described the systematic buildup of mathematical designs in his artworks. He wrote, "crystallographers have opened the gate leading to an extensive domain".

Hexagonal tessellation with animals: Study of Regular Division of the Plane with Reptiles (1939). Escher reused the design in his 1943 lithograph Reptiles.

After his 1936 journey to the Alhambra and to La Mezquita, Cordoba, where he sketched the Moorish architecture and the tessellated mosaic decorations, Escher began to explore tessellation using geometric grids as the basis for his sketches. He then extended these to form complex interlocking designs, for example with animals such as birds, fish, and reptiles. One of his first attempts at a tessellation was his pencil, India ink, and watercolour Study of Regular Division of the Plane with Reptiles (1939), constructed on a hexagonal grid. The heads of the red, green, and white reptiles meet at a vertex; the tails, legs, and sides of the animals interlock exactly. It was used as the basis for his 1943 lithograph Reptiles.

His first study of mathematics began with papers by George Pólya and by the crystallographer Friedrich Haag on plane symmetry groups, sent to him by his brother Berend, a geologist. He carefully studied the 17 canonical wallpaper groups and created periodic tilings with 43 drawings of different types of symmetry. (Note: Escher made it clear that he did not understand the abstract concept of a group, but he did grasp the nature of the 17 wallpaper groups in practice.) From this point on, he developed a mathematical approach to expressions of symmetry in his artworks using his own notation. Starting in 1937, he created woodcuts based on the 17 groups. His Metamorphosis I (1937) began a series of designs that told a story through the use of pictures. In Metamorphosis I, he transformed convex polygons into regular patterns in a plane to form a human motif. He extended the approach in his piece Metamorphosis III, which is almost seven metres long.

In 1941 and 1942, Escher summarised his findings for his own artistic use in a sketchbook, which he labeled (following Haag) Regelmatige vlakverdeling in asymmetrische congruente veelhoeken ("Regular division of the plane with asymmetric congruent polygons"). The mathematician Doris Schattschneider unequivocally described this notebook as recording "a methodical investigation that can only be termed mathematical research." She defined the research questions he was following as

(1) What are the possible shapes for a tile that can produce a regular division of the plane, that is, a tile that can fill the plane with its congruent images such that every tile is surrounded in the same manner?
(2) Moreover, in what ways are the edges of such a tile related to each other by isometries?

=== Geometries ===
Although Escher did not have mathematical training – his understanding of mathematics was largely visual and intuitive – his art had a strong mathematical component, and several of the worlds that he drew were built around impossible objects. After 1924, Escher turned to sketching landscapes in Italy and Corsica with irregular perspectives that are impossible in natural form. His first print of an impossible reality was Still Life and Street (1937); impossible stairs and multiple visual and gravitational perspectives feature in popular works such as Relativity (1953). (Note: See Relativity (M. C. Escher) article for image.) House of Stairs (1951) attracted the interest of the mathematician Roger Penrose and his father, the biologist Lionel Penrose. In 1956, they published a paper, "Impossible Objects: A Special Type of Visual Illusion" and later sent Escher a copy. Escher replied, admiring the Penroses' continuously rising flights of steps, and enclosed a print of Ascending and Descending (1960). The paper contained the tribar or Penrose triangle, which Escher used repeatedly in his lithograph of a building that appears to function as a perpetual motion machine, Waterfall (1961). (Note: See Waterfall (M. C. Escher) article for image.)

Escher was interested enough in Hieronymus Bosch's 1500 triptych The Garden of Earthly Delights to re-create part of its right-hand panel, Hell, as a lithograph in 1935. He reused the figure of a Medieval woman in a two-pointed headdress and a long gown in his lithograph Belvedere in 1958; the image is, like many of his other "extraordinary invented places", peopled with "jesters, knaves, and contemplators". Thus, Escher not only was interested in possible or impossible geometry but was, in his own words, a "reality enthusiast"; he combined "formal astonishment with a vivid and idiosyncratic vision".

Escher worked primarily in the media of lithographs and woodcuts, although the few mezzotints he made are considered to be masterpieces of the technique. In his graphic art, he portrayed mathematical relationships among shapes, figures, and space. Integrated into his prints were mirror images of cones, spheres, cubes, rings, and spirals.

Escher was fascinated by mathematical objects such as the Möbius strip, which has only one surface. His wood engraving Möbius Strip II (1963) depicts a chain of ants marching forever over what, at any one place, are the two opposite faces of the object—which are seen on inspection to be parts of the strip's single surface. In Escher's own words:

An endless ring-shaped band usually has two distinct surfaces, one inside and one outside. Yet on this strip nine red ants crawl after each other and travel the front side as well as the reverse side. Therefore the strip has only one surface.

The mathematical influence in his work became prominent after 1936, when, having boldly asked the Adria Shipping Company if he could sail with them as travelling artist in return for making drawings of their ships, they surprisingly agreed, and he sailed the Mediterranean, becoming interested in order and symmetry. Escher described this journey, including his repeat visit to the Alhambra, as "the richest source of inspiration I have ever tapped".

Escher's interest in curvilinear perspective was encouraged by his friend and "kindred spirit", the art historian and artist Albert Flocon, in another example of constructive mutual influence. Flocon identified Escher as a "thinking artist" alongside Piero della Francesca, Leonardo da Vinci, Albrecht Dürer, Wenzel Jamnitzer, Abraham Bosse, Girard Desargues, and Père Nicon. Flocon was delighted by Escher's Grafiek en tekeningen ("Graphics and Drawings"), which he read in 1959. This stimulated Flocon and André Barre to correspond with Escher and to write the book La Perspective curviligne ("Curvilinear perspective").

=== Platonic and other solids ===
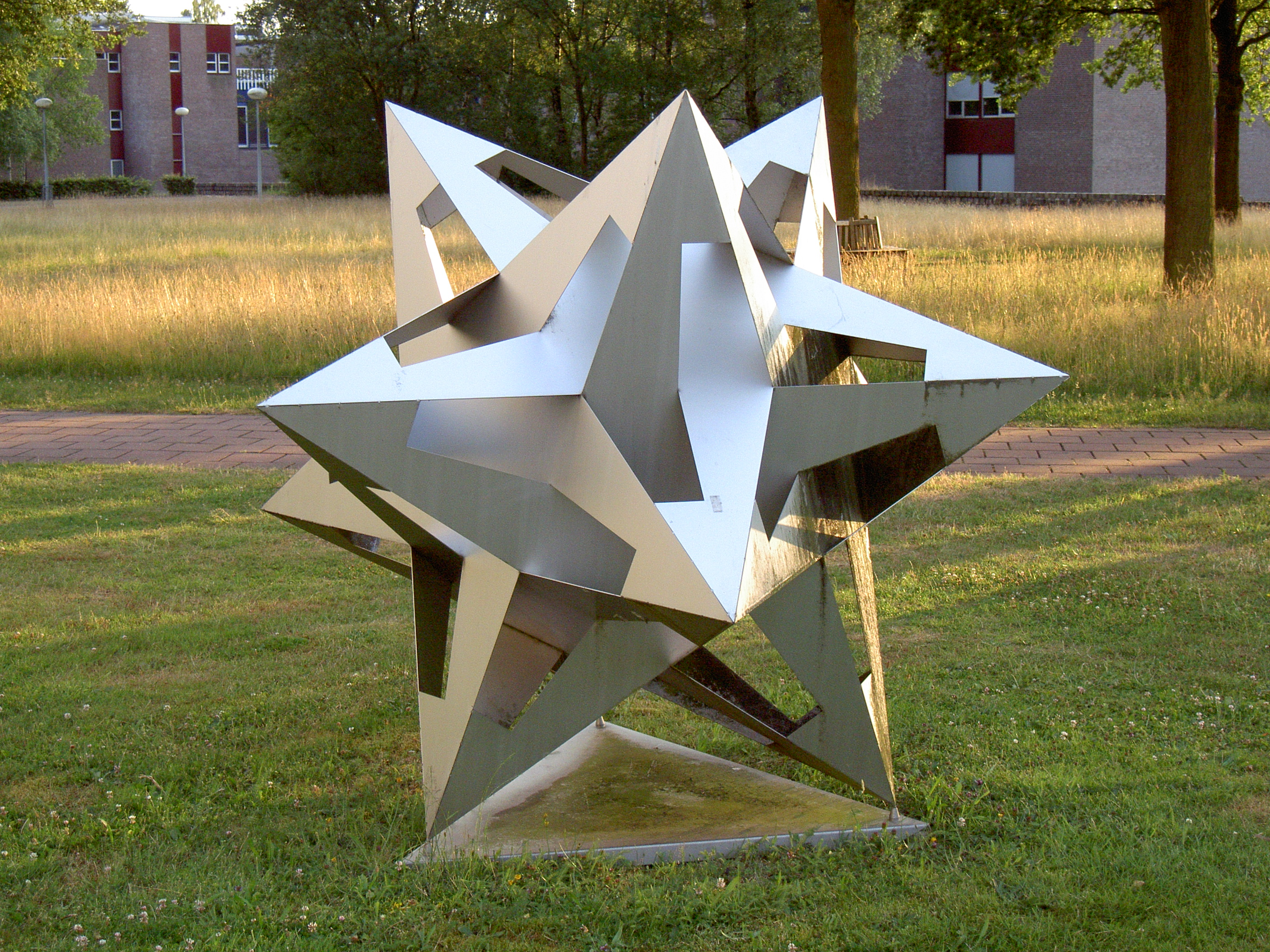
Sculpture of a small stellated dodecahedron, as in Escher's 1952 work Gravitation (University of Twente)

Escher often incorporated three-dimensional objects such as spheres, Platonic solids, including tetrahedrons and cubes, into his works, as well as mathematical objects such as cylinders and stellated polyhedra. In the print Reptiles, he combined two- and three-dimensional images. In one of his papers, Escher emphasized the importance of dimensionality:

The flat shape irritates me — I feel like telling my objects, you are too fictitious, lying there next to each other static and frozen: do something, come off the paper and show me what you are capable of! ... So I make them come out of the plane. ... My objects ... may finally return to the plane and disappear into their place of origin.

Escher's artwork is especially well-liked by mathematicians such as Doris Schattschneider and scientists such as Roger Penrose, who enjoy his use of polyhedra and geometric distortions. For example, in Gravitation, animals climb around a stellated dodecahedron.

The two towers of Waterfall's impossible building are topped with compound polyhedra, one a compound of three cubes, the other a stellated rhombic dodecahedron now known as Escher's solid. Escher had used this solid in his 1948 woodcut Stars, which contains all five of the Platonic solids and various stellated solids, representing stars; the central solid is animated by chameleons climbing through the frame as it whirls in space. Escher possessed a 6 cm refracting telescope and was a keen-enough amateur astronomer to have recorded observations of binary stars.

=== Levels of reality ===
Escher's artistic expression was created from images in his mind, rather than directly from observations and travels to other countries. His interest in the multiple levels of reality in art is seen in works such as Drawing Hands (1948), where two hands are shown, each drawing the other. (Note: See Drawing Hands article for image.) The critic Steven Poole commented that

It is a neat depiction of one of Escher's enduring fascinations: the contrast between the two-dimensional flatness of a sheet of paper and the illusion of three-dimensional volume that can be created with certain marks. In Drawing Hands, space and the flat plane coexist, each born from and returning to the other, the black magic of the artistic illusion made creepily manifest.

=== Infinity and hyperbolic geometry ===
Doris Schattschneider's reconstruction of the diagram of hyperbolic tiling sent by Escher to the mathematician Donald Coxeter

In 1954, the International Congress of Mathematicians met in Amsterdam, and N. G. de Bruin organised a display of Escher's work at the Stedelijk Museum for the participants. Both Roger Penrose and H. S. M. Coxeter were deeply impressed with Escher's intuitive grasp of mathematics. Inspired by Relativity, Penrose devised his tribar, and his father, Lionel Penrose, devised an endless staircase. Roger Penrose sent sketches of both objects to Escher, and the cycle of invention was closed when Escher then created the perpetual motion machine of Waterfall and the endless march of the monk-figures of Ascending and Descending. In 1957 Coxeter obtained Escher's permission to use two of his drawings in his paper "Crystal symmetry and its generalizations". He sent Escher a copy of the paper; Escher recorded that Coxeter's figure of a hyperbolic tessellation "gave me quite a shock": the infinite regular repetition of the tiles in the hyperbolic plane, growing rapidly smaller towards the edge of the circle, was precisely what he wanted to allow him to represent infinity on a two-dimensional plane.

Escher carefully studied Coxeter's figure, marking it up to analyse the successively smaller circles (Note: Schattschneider notes that Coxeter observed in March 1964 that the white arcs in Circle Limit III "were not, as he and others had assumed, badly rendered hyperbolic lines but rather were branches of equidistant curves.") with which (he deduced) it had been constructed. He then constructed a diagram, which he sent to Coxeter, showing his analysis; Coxeter confirmed it was correct, but disappointed Escher with his highly technical reply. All the same, Escher persisted with hyperbolic tiling, which he called "Coxetering". Among the results were the series of wood engravings Circle Limit I–IV. (Note: See Circle Limit III article for image.) In 1959, Coxeter published his finding that these works were extraordinarily accurate: "Escher got it absolutely right to the millimeter".

== Legacy ==
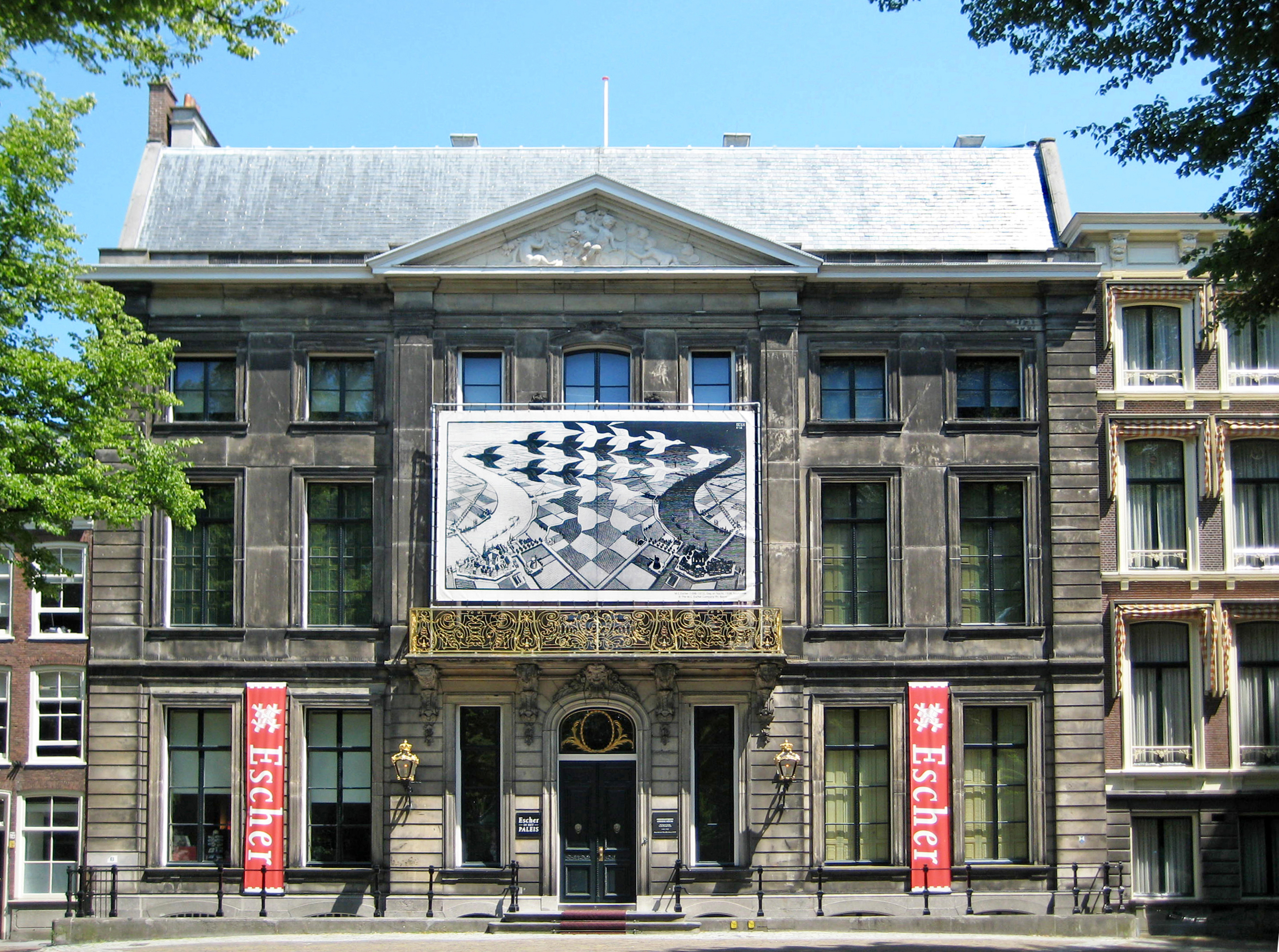
The Escher Museum in The Hague. The poster shows a detail from Day and Night, 1938.

=== In art collections ===
The Escher intellectual property is controlled by the M.C. Escher Heritage BV and its subsidiary M.C. Escher Company BV, while exhibitions of his artworks are managed separately by the M.C. Escher Foundation. (Note: In 1969, Escher's business advisor, Jan W. Vermeulen, author of a biography on the artist, established the M.C. Escher Foundation, and transferred into this entity virtually all of Escher's unique work as well as hundreds of his original prints. These works were lent by the Foundation to the Hague Museum. Upon Escher's death, his three sons dissolved the Foundation, and they became partners in the ownership of the art works. In 1980, this holding was sold to an American art dealer and the Hague Museum. The Museum obtained all of the documentation and the smaller portion of the art works. The copyrights remained the possession of Escher's three sons – who later sold them to Cordon Art, a Dutch company. Control was subsequently transferred to The M.C. Escher Company B.V. of Baarn, Netherlands, which licenses use of the copyrights on all of Escher's art and on his spoken and written text. A related entity, the M.C. Escher Foundation of Baarn, promotes Escher's work by organizing exhibitions, publishing books and producing films about his life and work.)

The primary institutional collections of original works by M.C. Escher are exhibited at the Escher Museum in The Hague (which are part of the large collection of the Kunstmuseum there); the National Gallery of Art (Washington, DC); the National Gallery of Canada (Ottawa); the Israel Museum (Jerusalem); and the Huis ten Bosch (Nagasaki, Japan).

=== Exhibitions ===
Poster advertising the first major exhibition of Escher's work in Britain (Dulwich Picture Gallery, 14 October 2015 – 17 January 2016). The image, which shows Escher and his interest in geometric distortion and multiple levels of distance from reality, is based on his Hand with Reflecting Sphere, 1935.

Despite wide popular interest, Escher was for a long time somewhat neglected in the art world; even in his native Netherlands, he was 70 before a retrospective exhibition was held. (Note: Steven Poole comments "The artist [Escher] who created some of the most memorable images of the 20th century was never fully embraced by the art world.") In the twenty-first century, major exhibitions have been held in cities around the world. An exhibition of his work in Rio de Janeiro attracted more than 573,000 visitors in 2011; its daily visitor count of 9,677 made it the most visited museum exhibition of the year, anywhere in the world. No major exhibition of Escher's work was held in Britain until 2015, when the Scottish National Gallery of Modern Art ran one in Edinburgh from June to September 2015, moving in October 2015 to the Dulwich Picture Gallery, London. The exhibition poster is based on Hand with Reflecting Sphere, 1935, which shows Escher in his house reflected in a handheld sphere, thus illustrating the artist, his interest in levels of reality in art (e.g., is the hand in the foreground more real than the reflected one?), perspective, and spherical geometry. The exhibition moved to Italy in 2015–2016, attracting over 500,000 visitors in Rome and Bologna, and then Milan.

In 2023, the Kunstmuseum in the Hague created a large retrospective of Escher, entitled 'Escher – Other World'.

=== In mathematics and science ===
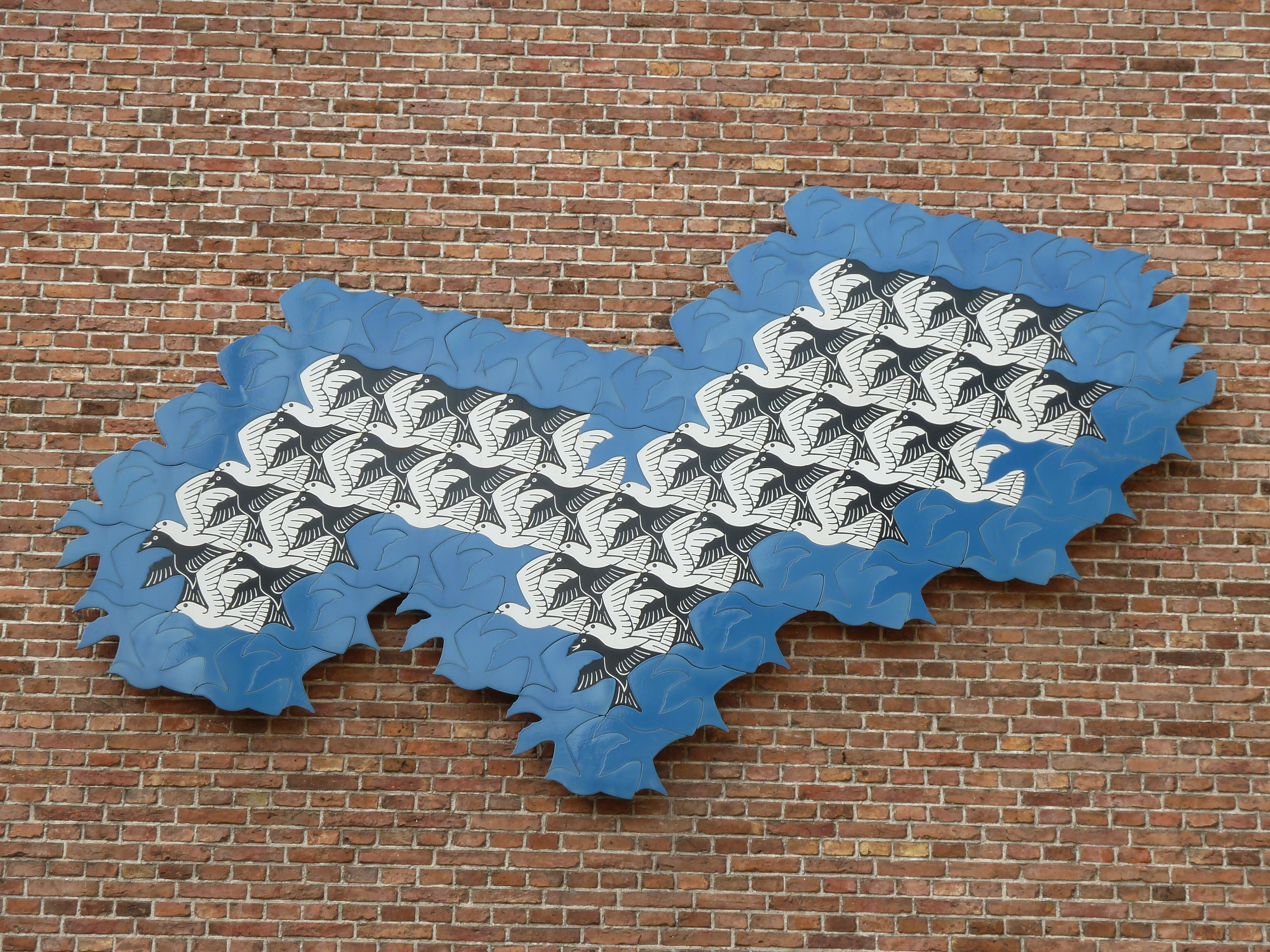
Wall tableau of one of Escher's bird tessellations at the Princessehof Ceramics Museum in Leeuwarden

Doris Schattschneider identifies eleven strands of mathematical and scientific research anticipated or directly inspired by Escher. These are the classification of regular tilings using the edge relationships of tiles: two-color and two-motif tilings (counterchange symmetry or antisymmetry); color symmetry (in crystallography); metamorphosis or topological change; covering surfaces with symmetric patterns; Escher's algorithm (for generating patterns using decorated squares); creating tile shapes; local versus global definitions of regularity; symmetry of a tiling induced by the symmetry of a tile; orderliness not induced by symmetry groups; the filling of the central void in Escher's lithograph Print Gallery by H. Lenstra and B. de Smit.

The Pulitzer Prize-winning 1979 book Gödel, Escher, Bach by Douglas Hofstadter discusses the ideas of self-reference and strange loops expressed in Escher's art. The asteroid 4444 Escher was named in Escher's honor in 1985.

=== In popular culture ===
Escher's fame in popular culture grew when his work was featured by Martin Gardner in his April 1966 "Mathematical Games" column in Scientific American. Escher's works have appeared on many album covers including The Scaffold's 1969 L the P with Ascending and Descending; Mott the Hoople's eponymous 1969 record with Reptiles, Beaver & Krause's 1970 In A Wild Sanctuary with Three Worlds; and Mandrake Memorial's 1970 Puzzle with House of Stairs and (inside) Curl Up. (Note: These and further albums are listed by Coulthart.) His works have similarly been used on many book covers, including some editions of Edwin Abbott's Flatland, which used Three Spheres; E. H. Gombrich's Meditations on a Hobby Horse with Horseman; Pamela Hall's Heads You Lose with Plane Filling 1; Patrick A. Horton's Mastering the Power of Story with Drawing Hands; Erich Gamma et al.'s Design Patterns: Elements of Reusable Object-oriented software with Swans; and Arthur Markman's Knowledge Representation with Reptiles. (Note: These and further books are listed by Bailey.) The "World of Escher" markets posters, neckties, T-shirts, and jigsaw puzzles of Escher's artworks. Both Austria and the Netherlands have issued postage stamps commemorating the artist and his works. In 1996, Byron Preiss and Harry N. Abrams Inc. published Escher Interactive for Microsoft Windows, a CD-ROM that contained a digital gallery and interactive games inspired by Escher's work. In 2019, Robin Lutz wrote and directed the documentary film M.C. Escher: Journey To Infinity, telling the story of Escher's life and art.

== See also ==
- Escher sentences, named after works like Ascending and Descending
- Oscar Reutersvärd
- Victor Vasarely
