= Indian Space Painters =

American modernist painting style

The Indian Space Painters were a group of mid-century American modernist artists who were influenced by Native American art, European surrealism and Abstract Expressionism. They were primarily active in the post WWII years during the late 1940s and early 1950s.

Many of their works were inspired by the motifs of the Indigenous peoples of the Pacific Northwest Coast combined with non-objective forms. Their formal language was primarily organic rather than geometric. Colors were usually laid down in flat patterns in a bright palette that emphasized figure-ground relationships. Other indigenous influences include the art of the Puebloan peoples of American Southwest, as well as Peruvian textiles.

Artists who practiced the style include Gertrude Barrer (1921–1997), Peter Busa (1914–1985), Howard Daum (1917–1988), Steve Wheeler, Robert Barrell, Will Barnet Oscar Collier, Helen De Mott, Ruth Lewin, Lilian Orloff, among others.

== Criticism ==
Indian Space Painting has been publicly criticized, and described as "complex and contentious". Critics have called the style problematic and referred to it as modernist primitivism that constitutes "an anthropologizing of form." Scholar of Native American art, W. Jackson Rushing, discussed the work as "cultural nationalism." The online art magazine, Hyperallergic states that Howard Daum coined the name "Indian Space Painting" in 1946, a name that is "now decidedly un-PC."
