= Marjory Bates Pratt =

American poet

Marjory Bates Pratt (16 July 1896 – 7 July 1992) was an American psychologist and poet.

== Early life ==
Marjory Bates was born on 16 July 1896 in Waterville, Maine to Horatio Dennis and Abby Francis (Caldwell) Bates. She received her B.A. from Smith College in 1917, and her M.A. and doctorate in psychology from Clark University in 1920 and 1922, respectively. She worked as an instructor in psychology at Wellesley College and Ohio State University.

In 1917 she married Carroll C. Pratt, also a psychologist. The two were both fellows in experimental psychology at Clark University, where they became friends with Edwin Boring and his wife Lucy. In 1962, the Pratts moved to Pennington, New Jersey. They had two children.

== Later life ==
She was an active member of the Fellowship of Reconciliation; she organized at least one civil rights workshop with them, opposed the Vietnam War, and protested against the biological warfare research program at Fort Detrick.

She published several books of haiku throughout her life, as well as a book of visual designs based on the phonetic qualities of Shakespeare's sonnets. Her haiku have been included in The Haiku Anthology (Anchor Press, 1974), Canadian Haiku Anthology (Three Trees Press, 1979), and The Haiku Handbook (McGraw-Hill, 1985). She was also a calligrapher, and taught calligraphy classes with the Princeton Adult School.

She died on 7 July 1992 at the Hunterdon Medical Center.

== Works ==
- "The visual estimation of angles." Journal of Experimental Psychology (Vol. 9, Issue 2), April 1926, pages 132–140.
- Formal Designs from Ten Shakespeare Sonnets (1940)
- Caldwells & Clipper Ships (1965?)
- The Light on the Snow (1979?)
