= Lucy May Boring =

American psychologist

Lucy May Day Boring (27 August 1886 – 26 July 1996) was an American psychologist.

== Early life ==
Lucy May Day was born on 27 August 1886 in Framingham, Massachusetts. She attended Mount Holyoke College, obtaining her B.A. in mathematics in 1908. She completed a doctoral degree in experimental psychology at Cornell University under Edward Titchener, receiving her Ph.D. in 1912. Her dissertation focused on peripheral color vision.

Though Titchener was her advisor, she was unable to join his research and discussion group, the "Titchener Experimentalists," as he adamantly refused to allow women to participate. On one occasion, however, she listened in from a neighboring room with its door ajar.

In 1914, she married Edwin G. Boring, a fellow Cornell student under Titchener. They became engaged in October 1911, and were married the day after he received his doctorate. She taught briefly at Vassar College and Wells College before, in her own words, "giving up a career for family life" when the first of their four children was born in 1916. However, she continued to assist her husband with his work, and "read (and advised) every book and article" he wrote.

She held an honorary fellowship at Clark University from 1919 to 1922, where she and her husband (also a fellow) became friends with Marjory Bates Pratt and Carroll C. Pratt.

== Later life ==
In 1951, the Borings bought a farm in Harborside, Maine; they split their time between there and Cambridge.

Lucy Boring died on 26 July 1996 in Cambridge, Massachusetts.

== Works ==
- "A note on learning in paramecium" (with Madison Bentley) in Journal of Animal Behavior, vol. 1 (1911)
- "The effect of illumination on peripheral vision" in American Journal of Psychology, vol. 23 (October 1912)
- "Temporal judgements after sleep" (with Edwin G. Boring) in Studies in Psychology Contributed by Colleagues and Former Students of Edward Bradford Titchener (1917)
