= Negative space =

Space around an object

Rubin's vase is an optical illusion in which the negative space around the vase forms the silhouettes of two faces in profile, a well-known example of figure-ground reversal by emphasizing that negative space.

FedEx's logo displays an arrow between letters E and x. Not being in full silhouette, the effect is subtle and may not be noticed.

Negative space in the 1993–2017 Formula One logo depicting the digit 1.

In art and design, negative space or negative volume is the empty space around and between the subject(s) of an image. In graphic design this is known as white space. Negative space may be most evident when the space around a subject, not the subject itself, forms an interesting or artistically relevant shape, and such space occasionally is used to artistic effect as the "real" subject of an image.

== Overview ==
The use of negative space is a key element of artistic composition. The Japanese word "ma" is sometimes used for this concept, for example in garden design. In a composition, the positive space has the more visual weight while the surrounding space - that is less visually important is seen as the negative space.

In a two-tone, black-and-white image, a subject is normally depicted in black and the space around it is left blank (white), thereby forming a silhouette of the subject. Reversing the tones so that the space around the subject is printed black and the subject itself is left blank, however, causes the negative space to be apparent as it forms shapes around the subject. This is called figure-ground reversal.

In graphic design of printed or displayed materials, where effective communication is the objective, the use of negative space may be crucial. Not only within the typography, but in its placement in relation to the whole. It is the basis of why upper and lower case typography always is more legible than the use of all capital letters. Negative space varies around lower case letters, allowing the human eye to distinguish each word rapidly as one distinctive item, rather than having to parse out what the words are in a string of letters that all present the same overall profile as in all caps. The same judicious use of negative space drives the effectiveness of the entire design. Because of the long history of the use of black ink on white paper, "white space" is the term often used in graphics to identify the same separation.

Elements of an image that distract from the intended subject, or in the case of photography, objects in the same focal plane, are not considered negative space. Negative space may be used to depict a subject in a chosen medium by showing everything around the subject, but not the subject itself. Use of negative space will produce a silhouette of the subject. Most often, negative space is used as a neutral or contrasting background to draw attention to the main subject, which then is referred to as the positive space. In photography, negative space may also connote a type of shadows called ephemeral shadows. Here, lighting is used to express the existence of an unseen space.

== Use ==
Considering and improving the balance between negative space and positive space in a composition is considered by many to enhance the design. This basic, but often overlooked, principle of design gives the eye a "place to rest," increasing the appeal of a composition through subtle means.

The use of negative space in art may be analogous to silence in music, but only when it is juxtaposed with adjacent musical ideas. As such, there is a difference between inert and active silences in music, where the latter is more closely analogous to negative space in art.

Negative space in art, also referred to as "air space", is the space around and between objects. Instead of focusing on drawing the actual object, for a negative space drawing, the focus is on what's between the objects. For example, if one is drawing a plant, they would draw the space in-between the leaves, not the actual leaves. This technique requires one to forget about a conceptual meaning of an object and forces them to observe through shapes, rather than drawing what they may think an object looks like.

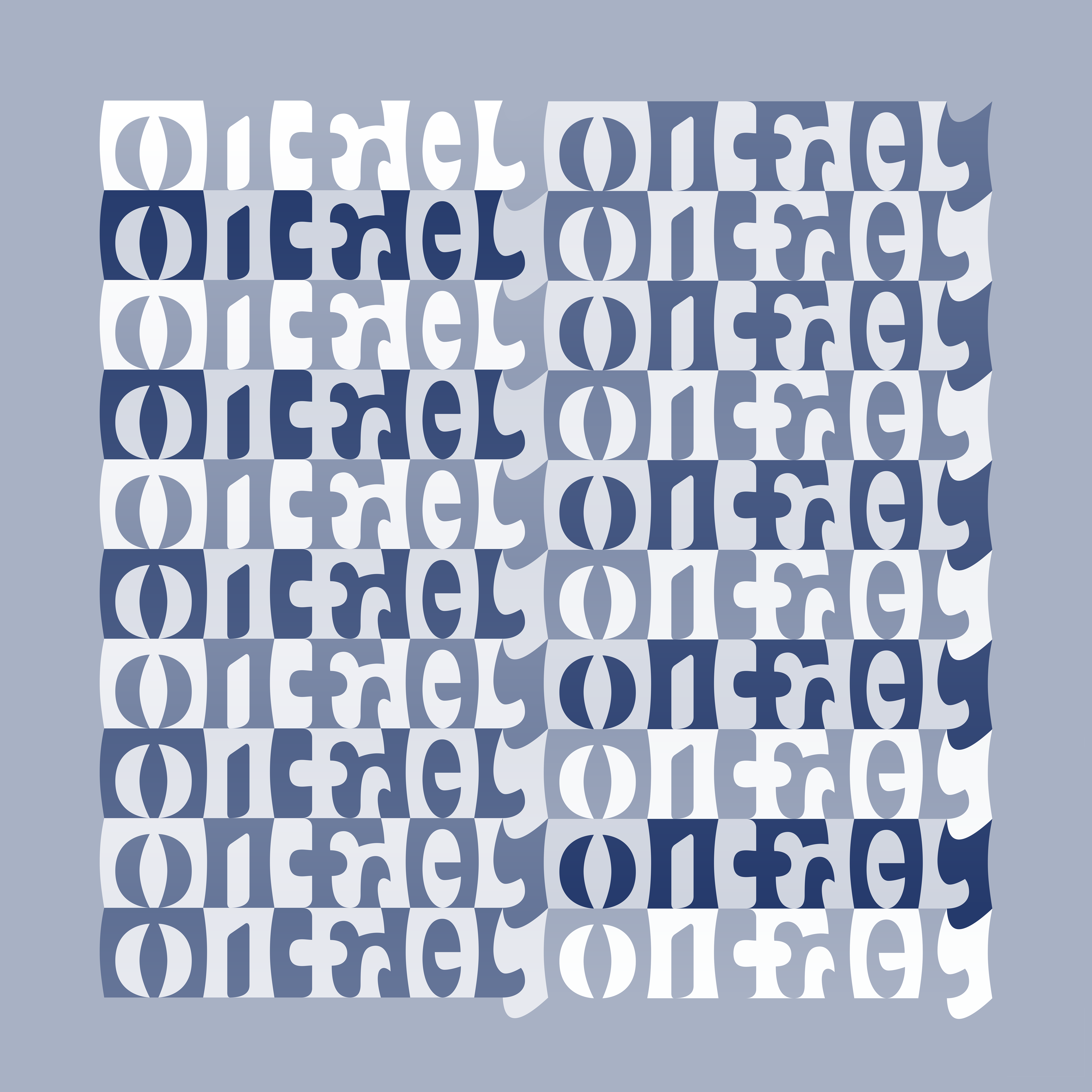
An ambigram depicting the name "Michel Onfray" using negative space, with the surname shaped by the letters of the given name, and reciprocally.

Negative space is used with figure-ground ambigrams and tessellations to display words or pictures in different directions after rotation (one way or other depending on the symmetry of the image).

== See also ==
- Composition (visual arts)
- Figure–ground (perception)
- Ma (negative space)
- Microtonality
- Reversing type
- Space (punctuation)
- Yin and yang
