= Font color (disambiguation) =

Font color is an HTML property.

It may also refer to:

- Text color
- Color font

== See also ==
- Type color
