= Edwin Boring =

American psychologist (1886–1968)

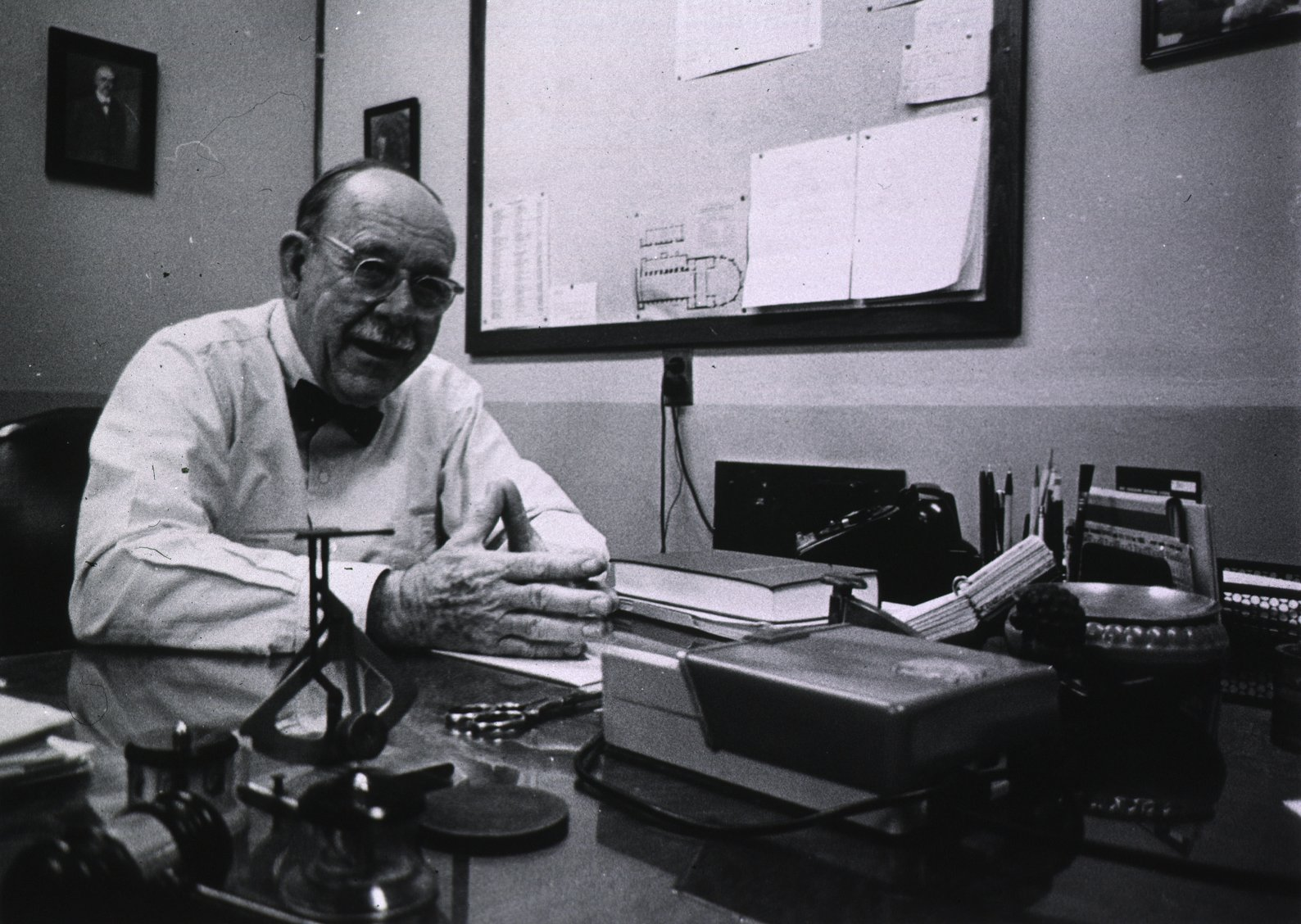
- Boring in 1961
- Born: Edwin Garrigues Boring; 23 October 1886; Philadelphia, Pennsylvania, U.S.
- Died: July 1, 1968 (aged 81); Cambridge, Massachusetts, U.S.
- Education: Cornell University
- Scientific career
- Fields: Experimental psychology
- Workplaces: Harvard University
- Doctoral advisor: Edward B. Titchener

Edwin Garrigues (Garry) Boring (October 23, 1886 – July 1, 1968) was an American experimental psychologist, Professor of Psychology at Clark University and at Harvard University, who later became one of the first historians of psychology. A Review of General Psychology survey, published in 2002, ranked Boring as the 93rd most cited psychologist of the 20th century, tied with John Dewey, Amos Tversky, and Wilhelm Wundt.

== Early life ==
Boring was born on October 23, 1886, in Philadelphia, Pennsylvania and grew up in a Quaker family interested in science. His elder sister was the zoologist Alice Middleton Boring. In 1904, Boring attended Cornell University, where he studied electrical engineering. He earned a ME degree in electrical engineering in 1908 and then took a job at Bethlehem Steel in Bethlehem, Pennsylvania. Boring returned to Cornell for an AM in physics, but he was instead drawn to the world of psychology by I. Madison Bentley's animal psychology course.

Boring notes that his interest in psychology had already begun in 1905, when he took an elementary psychology class as an elective while pursuing his engineering degree. Bentley's course was under the professorship of Edward B. Titchener and captured Boring's attention. On one test Boring received back, Titchener had written "You have the psychological point of view!" (p. 31). It was that remark that stuck with him and guided him toward psychology when he arrived at Cornell for the second time.

Boring's minor research strayed too far from Titchener's definition of psychology. It was at Titchener's suggestion that he decided to do his thesis on visceral sensibility. He conducted the study by placing a stomach tube in his own stomach to learn more about the sensations of the alimentary tract. The results indicated that the stomach and esophagus were more sensitive to temperature and pressure than had been realized. The studies indicate his interest, from an early age, in the physical and experimental components of psychology. In 1914, Boring's efforts were rewarded when he received his PhD.

While he was completing his studies, Boring and his wife, Lucy M. Day, joined Titchener's lab group and became part of Titchener's selective in-group. Most of their time at Cornell was spent working on Titchener's research projects. During Boring's time at Cornell, he developed a close relationship with Titchener, one that continued until Titchener's death, in 1927. Boring felt deep respect for Titchener and admired his dedication to his work. In his autobiography, he even remarked that he believed Titchener to be the closest to genius of anyone he knew.

Titchener presented Boring with his first opportunity not only to teach but also to practice writing about the history of experimental psychology. Titchener wanted to redesign a systematic psychology course and enlisted his graduate students to do the job. It was a large task; the course covered the entire history of psychology in 3 lectures a week for 2 years. Boring and the rest of the team read through German literature on experimental psychology and many other primary sources of information to complete this project. The finished product was a 200-lecture course. The task sparked Boring's interest in the history that shaped the field; it would also serve as great training for Boring's later publication of his own text, The History of Experimental Psychology, in 1929. The work also gave Boring experience in teaching psychology. He continued to teach psychology at Cornell for 4 years but was glad when the war forced him to leave this position, as he felt that Cornell did not need him.

== Intelligence testing in the First World War ==
During the First World War, Boring was not drafted because of the birth of his first son. Disappointment over not helping his country did not last for long. Robert M. Yerkes asked him to join in the development of intelligence testing. Boring was later appointed chief psychological examiner at Camp Upton in Long Island. Then, in 1918, Boring was asked to work on a massive report on the army intelligence program. Boring made his contribution during the war but was troubled afterward by the lack of scientific objectivity that resulted from intelligence testing. He found the use of probabilities to answer scientific questions to be particularly frustrating. At the time, Boring felt that science was a field of certainty, not probability. As a result, Boring remained cautious of intelligence testing throughout his life. When questions followed in later years about the definition of intelligence, Boring adopted the phrase "Intelligence is what the tests test" (p. 46).

== Professor of Psychology ==
=== Clark University ===
In 1920, Boring was offered a position at Harvard and was also offered a position to continue working with Yerkes in Minnesota. He chose Harvard because he believed that they had a greater need for him there; he had a mission to "rescue Harvard psychology from the philosophers" (p. 36) and transform psychology into a respectable science. Boring felt that the previous psychology professor, Hugo Münsterberg, had "vulgarized" (p. 46) the field by placing it in the philosophical realm; it was Boring's goal to bring the program to a more objective perspective. However, the summer before he was to start at Harvard, G. Stanley Hall, the president of Clark University, offered him a job as professor of experimental psychology for three years with the promise that if his work was satisfactory, his position would be made permanent. The appeal of stability led Boring to accept the position at Clark. Here, he enjoyed his work, but there were concerns regarding the status of psychology when the new president and geographer Wallace Walter Atwood was appointed, who wanted to replace newly popular psychology with geography. Controversy was also stirred during the Red Scare, when Atwood accused Boring of being a Bolshevik encouraging underground radicalism at Clark. Such allegations had no evidence of support, and while Boring waited for his reappointment to Clark, he received another offer from Harvard as an associate professor and an offer from Stanford University for a full professorship with a higher salary. The decision was made for Boring when Stanford withdrew the offer because of Boring's hesitation to accept it, leaving him to start a new career at Harvard.

=== Harvard University ===
His tenure at Harvard almost ended before it began, when he was injured in an automobile accident. Boring fractured his skull and had to stay in the hospital for six weeks. Also, the accident resulted in temporary retroactive and progressive amnesia. The experience caused Boring to question what it means to be conscious. If a person could not recall what the person had said moments afterward, could he really be considered conscious? Such questions become a lifelong endeavor for Boring to try to answer.

He was rewarded for his dedication to Harvard by being promoted to laboratory director in 1924; he held that position until 1949, when he resigned. In 1928, he received a full-time professorship; during that same year he was president of the American Psychological Association.

Boring was very interested in building a close relationship between the staff and students. At his suggestion, in 1924 the Harvard philosophy and psychology department began the first colloquium to build a sense of community.

In 1933, James B. Conant became president of Harvard. Conant's interest in psychology was considerably greater than the former president's, and in 1934, he accepted Boring's motion to separate the psychology and philosophy departments. By removing the philosophy go-between, the official break between the disciplines freed the psychological science faculty to focus on the research and experimental psychology questions that they wanted to answer. Boring emphasized the use of the experimental method, rather than the tools of philosophy, to investigate psychological questions. Boring's mission was finally complete. Boring was made the first chair of the Department of Psychology, but 2 years later, he resigned the position to Gordon W. Allport.

== Psychoanalysis treatments ==
Boring's self-criticism, fear of failure, and need for peer-acceptance became unmanageable and affected the productivity of his work. In 1933, at the suggestion of his friends and family, Boring began psychoanalysis treatment with a former colleague of Freud, Hanns Sachs. Boring remained in psychoanalysis for a year, five sessions a week, but he found it to be ineffective in alleviating his concerns. Boring had hoped to achieve a change in personality by the end of the experience and was disappointed to find that he still had his old mindset. Four years later, both Sachs and Boring wrote about the experience in the Journal of Abnormal and Social Psychology. The two men agreed that the psychoanalysis was not successful.

== Psychological organizations, conferences, and committees ==
In 1919–1922 Boring served as secretary of the American Psychological Association while James McKeen Cattell was president. The two men were both very passionate about their work and often clashed as a result. In 1928, Boring became president of the American Psychological Association.

Even with Boring's influence on the field of psychology, he influenced other disciplines as well. In 1945, he was elected as the chairman of the Publications Committee of the American Philosophical Society, of which he was a member. He was also a member of the American Academy of Arts and Sciences and the United States National Academy of Sciences.

In 1945, Robert M. Yerkes asked Boring to join his Survey and Planning Committee, designed to bring psychologists together to discuss issues regarding the war and the role psychologists could play during wartime to help provide services to the country. Boring suggested uniting the American Psychological Association and the Association for Applied Psychology and all other societies that were willing. It was an influential move that restructured the American Psychological Association into what it is today. The Intersociety Constitutional Convention was formed and first met in 1943. Boring was the first chairman of this Intersociety.

In 1966, Division 26, the Division for the History of Psychology, of the American Psychological Association was formed. During its formation, the Division 26 members made a gesture to honor Boring for his tremendous contribution as a historian of psychology. Boring declined to run for president and was made "honorary president" (p. 308) of the Division as an acknowledgment of his work. He was then asked to introduce the first elected president, Robert I. Watson, at the first official meeting, but old age prevented Boring from making the trip. He introduced him by a written statement he mailed, read by John A. Popplestone. In this speech, Boring made jokes that he was the ghost of history's past, a comment that was echoed by his voice being present without his body.

== Family ==
In 1914, he married fellow psychologist Lucy M. Day. They had four children; the first, a son, was born on January 11, 1916, the birthday of Edward B. Titchener, a colleague whom Boring held in high regard. Boring and his wife considered this to be a "happy omen" (p. 45). On July 1, 1968, Boring died in Cambridge, Massachusetts at 81 from multiple myeloma, a hereditary bone cancer which he acquired later in life. His remains were interred at Mount Auburn Cemetery in Cambridge, Massachusetts.

== Work ==
Although Boring conducted a lot of research during his career, most of it resulted in minor contributions to psychology. The vast majority of his research centered around sensory and perceptual phenomena. However, most of his time was spent teaching, doing administrative work, writing, editing, or guiding the research of his graduate students.

=== Figure-ground phenomena research ===
So-called "Boring figure"

Later in his career Boring became interested in the perceptual ambiguity of figure-ground phenomena. He discussed cartoonist W. E. Hill's "My Wife and My Mother-in-Law" in a 1930 journal article, explaining that this illustration was an accurate representation of the phenomena because the two different images are interpenetrating one another with no formal dividing line. He contrasted this image to Edgar Rubin's Rubin vase figure, where he felt that there is an obvious dividing line between the human profiles and goblets. This description made Hill's young-woman/old-woman puzzle famous and earned it the title of the "Boring figure".

=== Tonal brightness research ===
One graduate student with whom Boring developed a student-professor relationship similar to the one Boring had had with Titchener was Stanley Smith Stevens. In 1936 the two published their research on tonal brightness. At the time it was known that tonal brightness varied with pitch; and, based on previous research, it was believed that high tones are bright and low tones are dull. The question that Stevens and Boring researched was concerning the bright and dull tones that could be produced with a siren when the holes were appropriately spaced, hypothesizing that brightness varies with both the intensity and the frequency of the pitch. Boring suggested that they embrace the new technology and conduct the experiment with a cathode-ray oscilloscope and a wave-analyzer. They concluded through this study that tonal brightness is essentially the same as tonal density.

=== Moon illusion research ===
One of Boring's best-known projects is his 1940 study of the Moon illusion. Boring and fellow researcher A. H. Holway hypothesized that the Moon appears larger on the horizon because the eyes view it directly at a leveled position, while the Moon overhead appears smaller because the eyes must look up. They tested this experimentally, and found that for an observer whose eyes were kept in a fixed position while a circle representing the Moon moved up (through the use of a pulley system), the Moon appeared to increase in size. This illusion did not occur when participants were lying down while viewing the Moon, and they also found some evidence of it not occurring when viewing the Moon with only one eye. These results led the researchers to conclude that the illusion of Moon shrinkage depends on the movement of the eyes in the head, not the movement of the actual head, and that it depends on binocular vision, that is, the use of both eyes together. This study exemplifies Boring's interest in misperceptions of sensory experience.

=== Publications ===
Although Boring did make some research contributions, he had a larger impact through his writing. His first connection to psychological literature came about in 1926 when Boring became a joint editor of The American Journal of Psychology, which was originally started by G. Stanley Hall and later bought by K. M. Dallenbach for Cornell University and put under Titchener's control. When Titchener withdrew from the journal Dallenbach asked I. Madison Bentley, Margaret Floy Washburn, and Boring to pick up editorship of the journal. Boring accepted and remained an editor for 23 years.

==== A History of Experimental Psychology, 1929 ====
While studying at Cornell, the 200-lecture course Titchener had Boring and the rest of his graduate students design left an interest in Boring on the historical perspective of psychology. This later inspired him to publish his first book titled A History of Experimental Psychology in 1929 in hopes of making psychologists more "history-conscious" (p. 42). The book did well within the first year, selling 1,316 copies; many in the field enjoyed the text and the manner in which he described the history of the discipline. The text continued to prosper through the years, selling 16,765 copies in 1950. Most people still consider this to be Boring's most important work; the publication made him one of the first historians of psychology.

==== The Physical Dimensions of Consciousness, 1933 ====
His next work, The Physical Dimensions of Consciousness, appeared in 1933. Here, he attempts to accommodate behaviorism by viewing sensations through their physical mechanisms. In this, Boring expresses his monist physicalism perspective, similar to operationalism's emphasis on measurement in order to understand the meaning of concepts. Boring himself was surprised by his view being in direct opposition to his deeply respected mentor Titchener. However, Titchener was dead by this time. Having found Titchener's mentalist and dualist perspective untenable, Boring now focused on the physical brain rather than the abstract mind. One of the book's objectives is to clarify such complex terms as consciousness and sensation, questions that had been plaguing him since his automobile accident. Boring sought to establish what these phenomena represent in physical terms.

==== Psychology: a Factual Textbook, 1935 ====
Boring was approached by Harry P. Weld to collaborate with him and Herbert Langfeld on a psychology textbook, referred to as the BLW textbooks. The first edition was titled Psychology: a Factual Textbook and was published in 1935. This textbook focused mainly on the hard facts and each section was written by a specialist in the field of focus for that chapter. In 1939 the text was much revised and a second edition was published. The third edition published in 1948 was renamed Foundations of Psychology and it was greatly expanded to include new authors, chapters, and format.

==== Sensation and Perception in the History of Experimental Psychology, 1942 ====
He considered his most important work to be his second volume of history, Sensation and Perception in the History of Experimental Psychology, which was published in 1942. Boring dated the preface December 6, 1941, the day before the Japanese attack on Pearl Harbor, because, he argued, this was the last day "pure scholarship could be undertaken with a clear conscience" (p. 47). As a historian of psychology, Boring was well aware of the importance of place and time during which theories were proposed. In the last chapter of his book, Boring introduced Goethe and Johann Herder's idea of Zeitgeist. Both G. Stanley Hall and William James had occasionally used the term but it was Boring who popularized it. In several of his works and articles he refers to the Zeitgeist, recognizing how it affected the acceptance of his own ideas. For instance Boring describes forces of the time working to separate the disciplines of philosophy and psychology at Harvard, commenting that the change would have been made even without him there to propose it. Also in this book, Boring claimed that different areas of the tongue are sensitive to sweet, salty, sour and bitter tastes. This was based on misinterpreted data from a 1901 paper written by German scientist D. P. Hänig. This in turn led to the now discredited tongue map, which purports to show where tastes are detected. Boring later resigned from Harvard University in 1949 and in that same year published the second edition of A History of Experimental Psychology where he brought the text up to date on advancements in the field of psychology. He emphasizes the role of the Zeitgeist providing a context for the great thinkers in psychology to advance their ideas. Both volumes of the textbook were used by numerous graduate students in the 1960s and have played a large role in shaping psychologists' attitudes towards their field. It was considered to be "a classic, replacing a classic" (p. 60) in the world of psychology.

==== Psychology for the Fighting Man, 1943 ====
During the Second World War Boring made his contribution to the war efforts through his writing. Since the First World War there had been talk about the need for a textbook on military psychology but the war ended before the idea could be further developed. With the second war underway the idea resurfaced, and Boring felt confident that with his experience from his BLW textbooks he could write the textbook on military psychology.

The National Research Council's Emergency Committee on Psychology decided to create a book that would focus on the psychology of the majority of soldiers in the army, the ordinary GI, instead of focusing on the higher level officers. In 1943, Psychology for the Fighting Man was published. The book focused on practical information, such as boosting the morale of soldiers, personal-adjustment in the army, and obtainment of necessities such as food. The book sold 380,000 copies and brought The National Research Council about $10,000.

With that project complete Boring turned toward creating the military psychology textbook he had originally intended to work on. In 1945 he completed this work with the publication of Psychology for the Armed Services.

==== "The woman problem", 1951 ====
He published an article on his own in 1951 in the American Psychologist that focused on women in the field and emphasized his beliefs. He wrote about the disadvantages women in psychology face as the result of society which affects their professional advancement. He called this the "woman problem". Boring describes the standard procedure men undergo to achieve prestige in their career: a man must receive a PhD, conduct meaningful research that gets published, and undertake administrative work. If work is done well enough to impress their boss, men are likely to be promoted to higher positions and work in broader tasks such as publishing books, or becoming a dean or college president, allowing them to influence a wider range of people. It was the pursuit of prestige at higher positions that women lacked, largely because they were blocked from the higher-level jobs in the first place.

==== Psychology One, 1956 ====
Boring appeared on Psychology One, which was the first publicly televised introductory psychology course that aired in 1956. The program was designed to introduce psychology to the general public and provided an entertaining but insightful form of instruction. Among the topics Boring discussed on the show were the physics of sensations such as light and sound, the structures of sense organs, perceptual constancy and illusions and learning.

==== Psychologist at Large: Autobiography, 1961 ====
In 1961 Boring published a text about his career and life experiences. The book was titled Psychologist at Large: an Autobiography and Selected Essays. It was the extension of a chapter written previously for the series he had edited since 1930, A History of Psychology in Autobiography, which at that time was four volumes and contained autobiographical narratives by 58 eminent psychologists. Psychologist at Large was Boring's last book to be published.

==== Contemporary Psychology ====
In his seventies he continued to make contributions to the field through his writing. He founded and edited a journal that was dedicated exclusively to psychology book reviews, Contemporary Psychology. In this journal, Boring was able to shape the psychological works that were published. He demanded a high degree of quality which challenged psychologists to rise to his standard.

== Legacy ==
Boring left his legacy on the field of psychology in many ways. He was a historian, researcher, professor, critic, editor, and served in positions on many committees and intellectual societies. He acted through a wide range of faculties to leave his mark on psychology.

Boring taught psychology at Harvard University for 27 years. He had a profound impact, training many students who would go on to become influential in the field of psychology such as Stanley Smith Stevens. He pushed psychologists to adopt better writing habits which ultimately benefited the audiences that would later read these works. Instead of focusing on gaining success through his students' work, Boring led a professional life full of integrity, and was willing to sacrifice his own needs for those of his students.

His textbooks also provided his interpretations of the field and were read by thousands of people. In this way, his written work influenced countless students and fellow psychologists with whom he never came into physical contact.

Through the years Boring's rigidity softened and he was able to contribute to many areas in psychology. He was a man of experimental psychology, objective science, but also philosophical science. His research was based on sensory and perceptual phenomena, but he was also a statesman and advocate for women in psychology and military psychology.

The many contributions Boring made in psychology were recognized later in his lifetime. In 1956 Clark University offered him an honorary degree. Then a year later in 1957 the Society of Experimental Psychologists, a group he was a charter member of, held a special dinner in his honor where students and colleagues gave donations to Harvard to start the Boring Liberty Fund. Perhaps the greatest recognition Boring received for his work in progressing the field of psychology was in 1959 when the American Psychological Association honored him with the gold medal, praising him for "his varied and distinguished contributions to psychology as investigator, teacher, historian, theorist, administrator and statesman, popular expositor, and editor" (p. 796).

Boring had such a profound impact on psychology that Robert Yerkes even dubbed him "Mr. Psychology" (p. 445).

== Selected publications ==
- A History of Experimental Psychology (1929)
- The Physical Dimensions of Consciousness (1933)
- Sensation and Perception in the History of Experimental Psychology (1942)
- Introduction to Psychology (1938)
- Sensation and perception in the history of experimental psychology. New York: Appleton-Century-Crofts. (1942)
- Psychology for the Fighting Man (1943)
- Psychology for the Armed Services (1945)
- Foundations of Psychology (1948, with Herbert Langfeld and Harry Weld)
- A History of Experimental Psychology (1950) (2nd ed.). Englewood Cliffs, NJ: Prentice-Hall.
- Psychologist at Large: an Autobiography and Selected Essays (1961)
- History, Psychology, and Science: Selected Papers (1963)
- A Source Book in the History of Psychology (1965, as editor, with Richard J. Herrnstein)
- History of Psychology in Autobiography (vols I-IV, 1930–1952)
