= Accidental viewpoint =

Ambiguous image or illusion

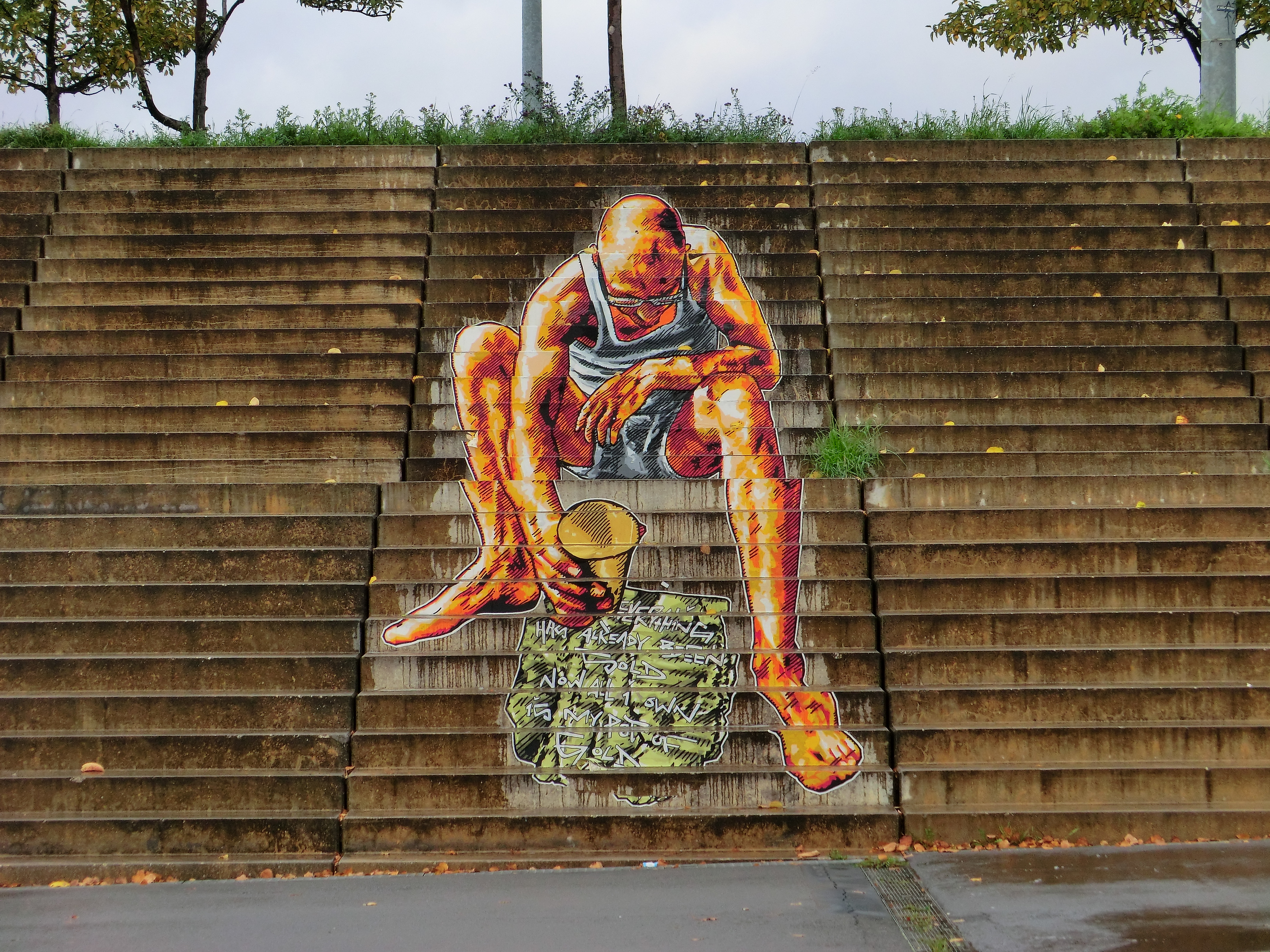
Street art illustrating the illusion of form-continuity from a particular viewpoint

An accidental viewpoint (i.e. eccentric or fixed viewpoint) is a singular position from which an image can be perceived, creating either an ambiguous image or an illusion. The image perceived at this angle is viewpoint-specific, meaning it cannot be perceived at any other position, known as generic or non-accidental viewpoints. These view-specific angles are involved in object recognition. In its uses in art and other visual illusions, the accidental viewpoint creates the perception of depth often on a two-dimensional surface with the assistance of monocular cues.

== Object recognition ==
According to the recognition-by-components theory, object recognition is viewpoint-invariant. However, viewpoint specific angles are a necessity in object recognition when identifiable features cannot be viewed from all angles. Object recognition is more accurate when identifying similarities between objects that are moving compared to objects that are static. In this case, viewing an object from an accidental viewpoint can result in altered perception in relation to mental prototypes. When viewing an object from an accidental viewpoint scene consistency is more critical for object recognition than when viewing that object from a non-accidental viewpoint, so in some cases viewing an object from its accidental viewpoint actually makes it harder to recognize the object, but we counteract that difficulty using contextual inference.

The Ambassadors, 1533, Hans Holbein the Younger

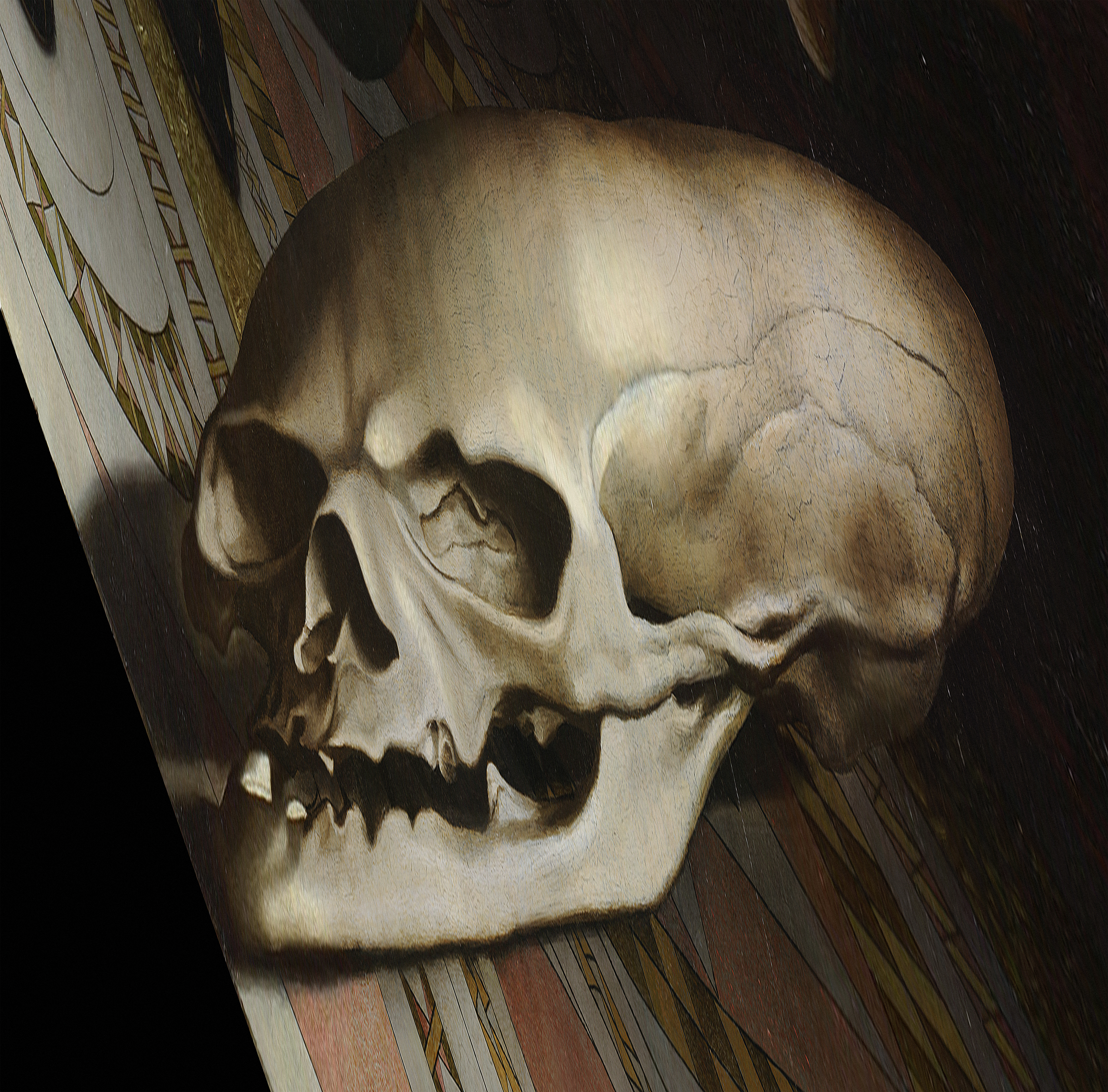
The Ambassador's Skull: detail when viewed from the accidental viewpoint (from The Ambassadors – Hans Holbein the Younger)

=== Controversy ===
2D symmetry was once thought to be able to facilitate 3D object recognition under accidental viewpoints. Some psychologists have proposed that the accidental viewpoints of 3D objects often involves the 2D symmetrical images that may not be perceived in the 3D objects. However, researches showed that 2D symmetry will not help object matching in accidental viewpoints, and others have argued that accidental viewpoints with 2D symmetry will even hinder 3D object matching and object recognition. Results from face recognition study also agrees on the negative effect of symmetric face from accidental views.

== Art ==
Accidental viewpoint contributes to the successful perception of anamorphic images, which intentionally appear distorted from non-accidental viewpoints. Other than viewing the image from a specific location, the distortion can be countered by looking at the image when reflected in a mirror (known as catoptric anamorphoses). How our brains interpret images make it so that the geometry of 2D object is related to that of 3D objects, rather than just taking the image for how it is, a drawing made from a single viewpoint. Related to this is the generic viewpoint assumption, which is the tendency to assume that image characteristics are not a result of an accidental viewpoint. The artist and mathematician Niceron developed a method of creating perspective anamorphic images by segmenting an image into a grid then distorting each segment of the grid from a square shape to a trapezoidal shape. The image can then be reconciled by viewing it from a specific point. Two dimensional art objects generally use the assumption of a single viewpoint to give the illusion of depth (monocular depth cues), Hans Holbein's The Ambassadors (1533) is no different in that sense, however, Holbein also includes an anamorphic image of a skull which has a completely different view point in order to accurately view the object. In the 17th century, perspective boxes (peep boxes, raree shows) became popular attractions. These took advantage of the accidental viewpoint by creating a scene that appeared to be three dimensional when viewed through a single hole in the box. A modern representation of anamorphic images that makes use of an accidental viewpoint can be found in illusionistic street art.

== Psychological illusion ==
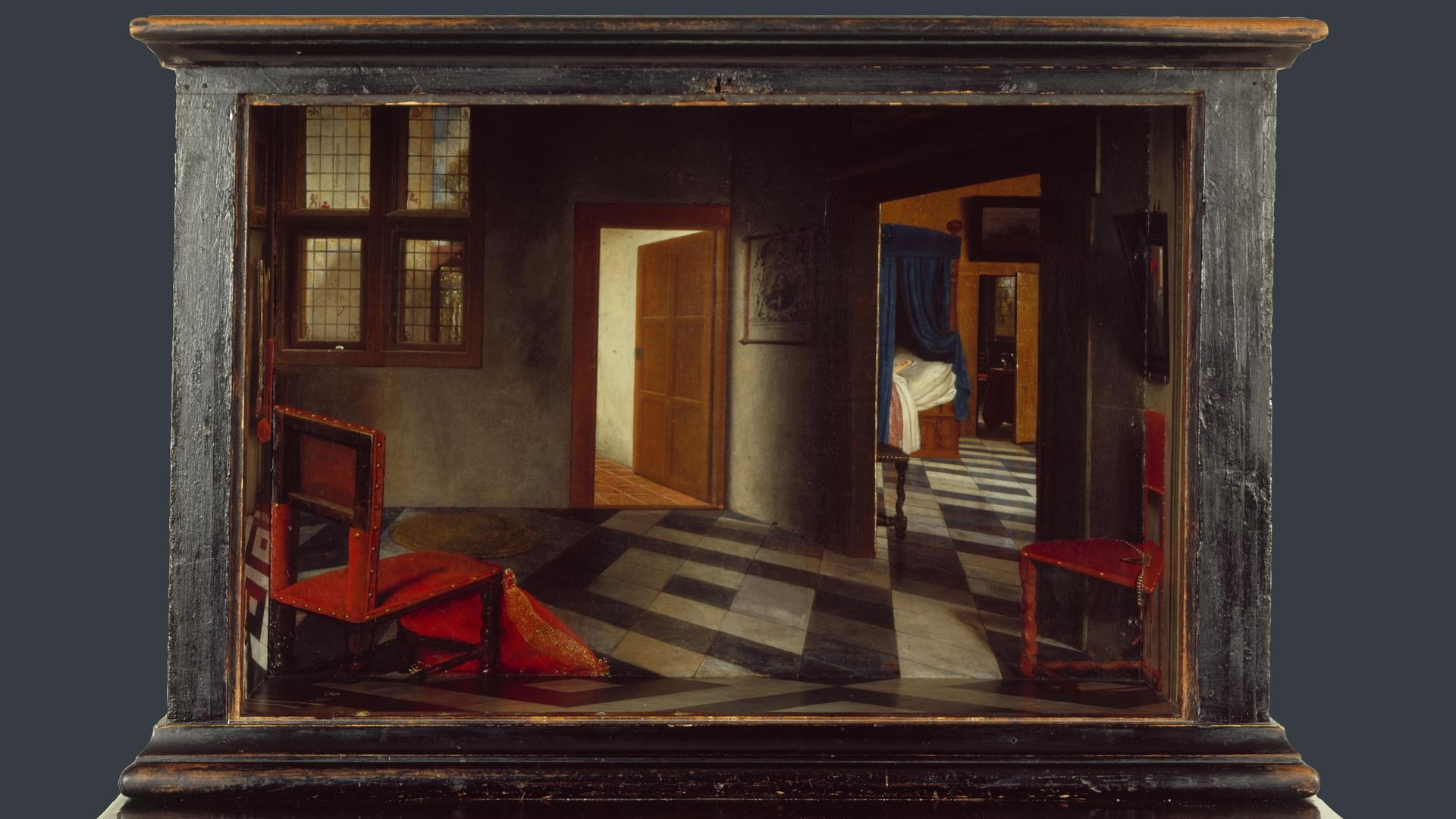
Peepshow with Views of the Interior of a Dutch House – Samuel van Hoogstraten

Psychologists have exploited the assumption of the generic viewpoint by using an accidental viewpoint to trick the brain into perceiving a scene that is realistically impossible. One famous example of this is the Ames room which uses distortion to create the image of a room that looks regular from an accidental viewpoint. When people interact with the room they appear to be changing size. The accidental viewpoint can also be used to trick Gestalt principles such that a curved line can appear straight when viewed from an accidental viewpoint. The accidental viewpoint it also used when creating possible versions of impossible object illusions.
