= Edgar Rubin =

Danish psychologist (1886–1951)

An example of Rubin's vase.

Edgar John Rubin (September 6, 1886 – May 3, 1951) was a Danish psychologist/phenomenologist, remembered for his work on figure-ground perception as seen in such optical illusions like the Rubin vase.

Born to Jewish parents, Rubin was born and raised in Copenhagen. Enrolling at the University of Copenhagen in 1904, he majored in psychology and finished his magister artium examination in philosophy in 1910.

== Gestalt psychology ==
Having specialized in figure–ground organization, Rubin spent the following two years as a research associate for Georg Elias Müller in Göttingen, Germany, examining the recognition of visual figures at different angles and sizes. His theories became influential within Gestalt psychology, yet Rubin is typically not included among the early influentials. Nor did he consider himself a Gestalt psychologist, being "sceptical of their attempts to construct wide-ranging theories". Nevertheless, his terminology was retained and featured in Kurt Koffka's Principles of Gestalt Psychology.

In 1922, Rubin became Professor of Psychology at the University of Copenhagen, a position he held until his death in 1951.
