= Figure–ground (perception) =

Humans' ability to separate foreground from background in visual images

The Rubin vase illusion, where it is ambiguous which part is the figure and which the ground

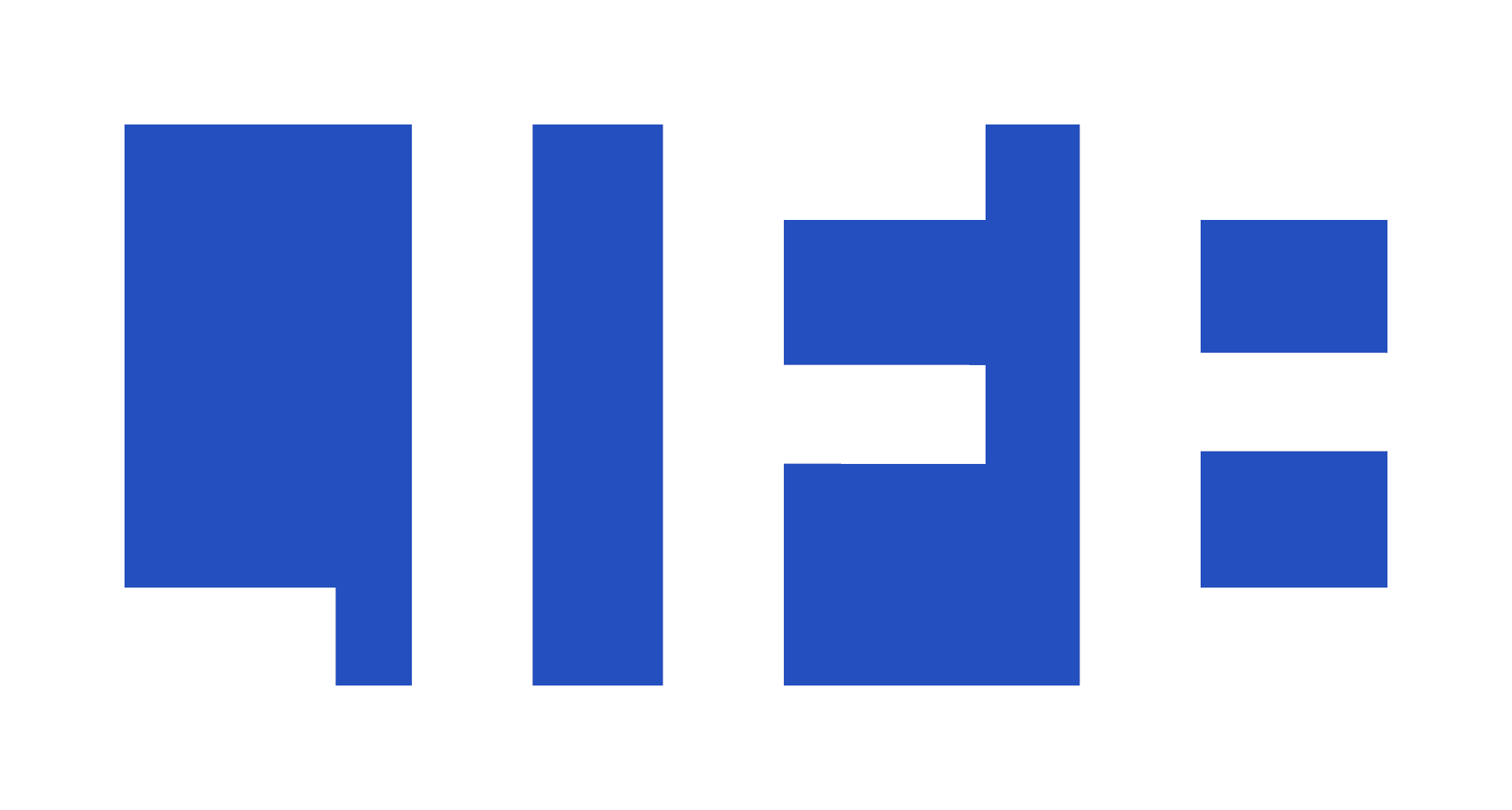
Shapes which can be read as a word once the viewer recognises them as being the isolated negative spaces of a word

Figure–ground organization is a type of perceptual grouping that is a vital necessity for recognizing objects through vision. In Gestalt psychology it is known as identifying a figure from the background. For example, black words on a printed paper are seen as the "figure", and the white sheet as the "background".

== Gestalt psychology ==
The Gestalt theory was founded in the 20th century in Austria and Germany as a reaction against the associationist and structural schools' atomistic orientation. In 1912, the Gestalt school was formed by Max Wertheimer, Wolfgang Köhler, and Kurt Koffka. The word "gestalt" is a German word translated to English as "pattern" or "configuration." Gestalt concepts can also be referred to as "holism." Gestalt Psychologists were attempting to humanize what was considered a sterile approach. Gestalt psychology establishes that the whole of anything is greater than its parts. The concepts explored by Wertheimer, Köhler, and Koffka in the 20th century established the foundation for the modern study of perception.

"The Gestalt concept is that "not only movement, or process as such, but also the direction and distribution of process is determined dynamically by interaction." sensory organization is not dependent upon isolated stimuli and local stimulation, but upon the relative properties of stimulation and the dynamical context."

Wertheimer described holism as the "fundamental formula" of Gestalt psychology: "There are wholes, the behavior of which is not determined by that of their individual elements, but where the part-processes are themselves determined by the intrinsic nature of the whole."

== Examples ==
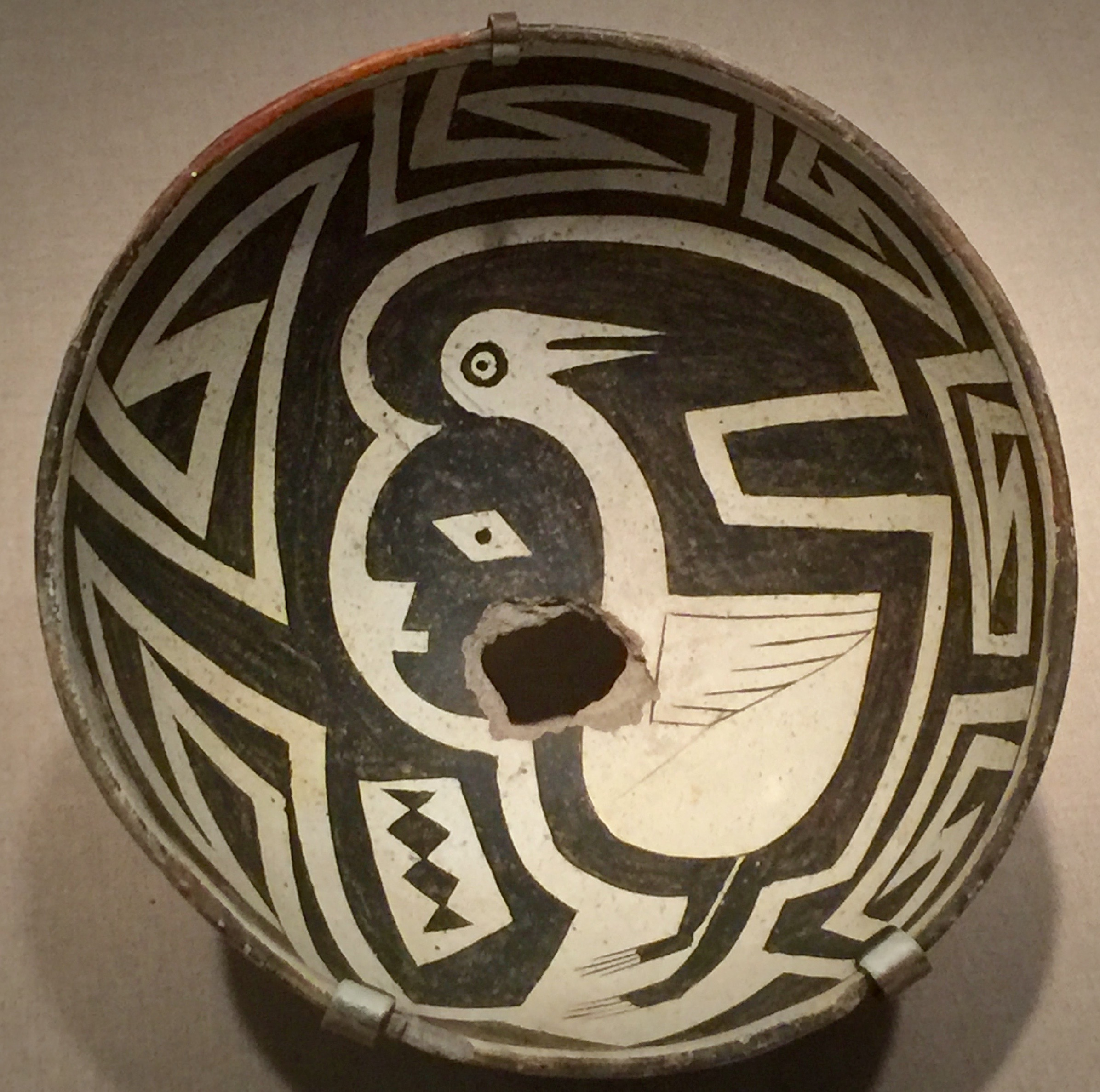
Man and crane, Mimbres culture pot, c. 1000 -1150 AD

The Rubin vase faces–vase drawing that Danish psychologist Edgar Rubin described exemplifies one of the key aspects of figure–ground organization, edge-assignment and its effect on shape perception. In the faces–vase drawing, the perceived shape depends critically on the direction in which the border (edge) between the black and white regions is assigned. If the edges between the black and white regions are assigned inward, then the central white region is seen as a vase shape in front of a black background. No faces are perceived in this case. On the other hand, if the edges are assigned outward, then the two black profile faces are perceived on a white background, and no vase shape is perceived. The human visual system will settle on either of the interpretations of the Rubin vase and alternate between them, a phenomenon known as multistable perception. Functional brain imaging shows that, when people see the Rubin image as a face, there is activity in the temporal lobe, specifically in the face-selective region.

An additional example is the "My Wife and My Mother-in-Law" illusion drawing. The image is famous for being reversible. "The viewer may either observe a young girl with her head turned to the right or an old woman with a large nose and protruding chin, depending on one's perspective."

The Flag of Canada has also been cited as an example of figure–ground reversal, in which the background edges of the maple leaf can also be seen as two faces arguing.

== Development ==
Figure–ground perception precedes all other visual perceptual skills and is one of the first to develop in a young baby. The development of perceptual organization develops as early as infancy in human beings. In regards to nature versus nurture, concepts such as "lightness" and "proximity" may develop as early as birth, but recognizing "form similarity" may not be functional until activated by particular experiences.

Three- to four-month olds respond to differences in lightness rather than differences in form similarity. It is suggested that scaffolding (the development of new skills over time based on the building of other skills) is responsible for the development of perceptual organization. Environment plays a major role in the development of figure-ground perception.

The development of figure–ground perception begins the day the baby can focus on an object. The faces of caregivers, parents, and familiar objects are the first to be focused on and understood. As babies develop, they learn to distinguish the objects they desire from their surroundings. Sitting up, crawling, and walking present ample opportunity to develop the skill during development. Between the ages of 2–4 the skill can be further cultivated by teaching the child to group or sort items.

== Perceptual process ==
The perceptual decision in which the brain decides which item is the figure and which are part of the ground in a visual scene can be based on many cues, all of which are of a probabilistic nature. For instance, size assists in distinguishing between the figure and the ground, as smaller regions are often (but not always) figures. Object shape can assist in distinguishing figure from ground because figures tend to be convex. Movement also helps; the figure may be moving against a static environment. Color is also a cue because the background tends to continue as one color behind potentially multiple foreground figures, whose colors may vary. Edge assignment also helps; if the edge belongs to the figure, it defines the shape while the background exists behind the shape. However, it is sometimes difficult to distinguish between the two because the edge that would separate figure from ground is part of neither, equally defining both the figure and the background.

The LOC (lateral occipital cortex) is highly important for figure–ground perception. This region of the visual cortex (located lateral to the fusiform gyrus and extending anteriorly and ventrally) has consistently shown stronger activation in response to objects versus non-objects."

Evidently, the process of distinguishing figure from ground (sometimes called figure–ground segmentation) is inherently probabilistic, and the best that the brain can do is to take all relevant cues into account to generate a probabilistic best-guess. In this light, Bayesian figure–ground segmentation models have been proposed to simulate the probabilistic inference by which the brain may distinguish figure from ground.

Subjective factors can also influence figure–ground perception. For instance, if a viewer has the intention to perceive one of the two regions as the figure, it will likely alter their ability to analyze the two regions objectively. In addition, if a viewer's gaze is fixated on a particular region, the viewer is more likely to view the fixated region as the figure. Although subjective factors can alter the probability of seeing the figure on one particular side of an edge, they tend not to overpower compositional cues.

== Artistic applications ==
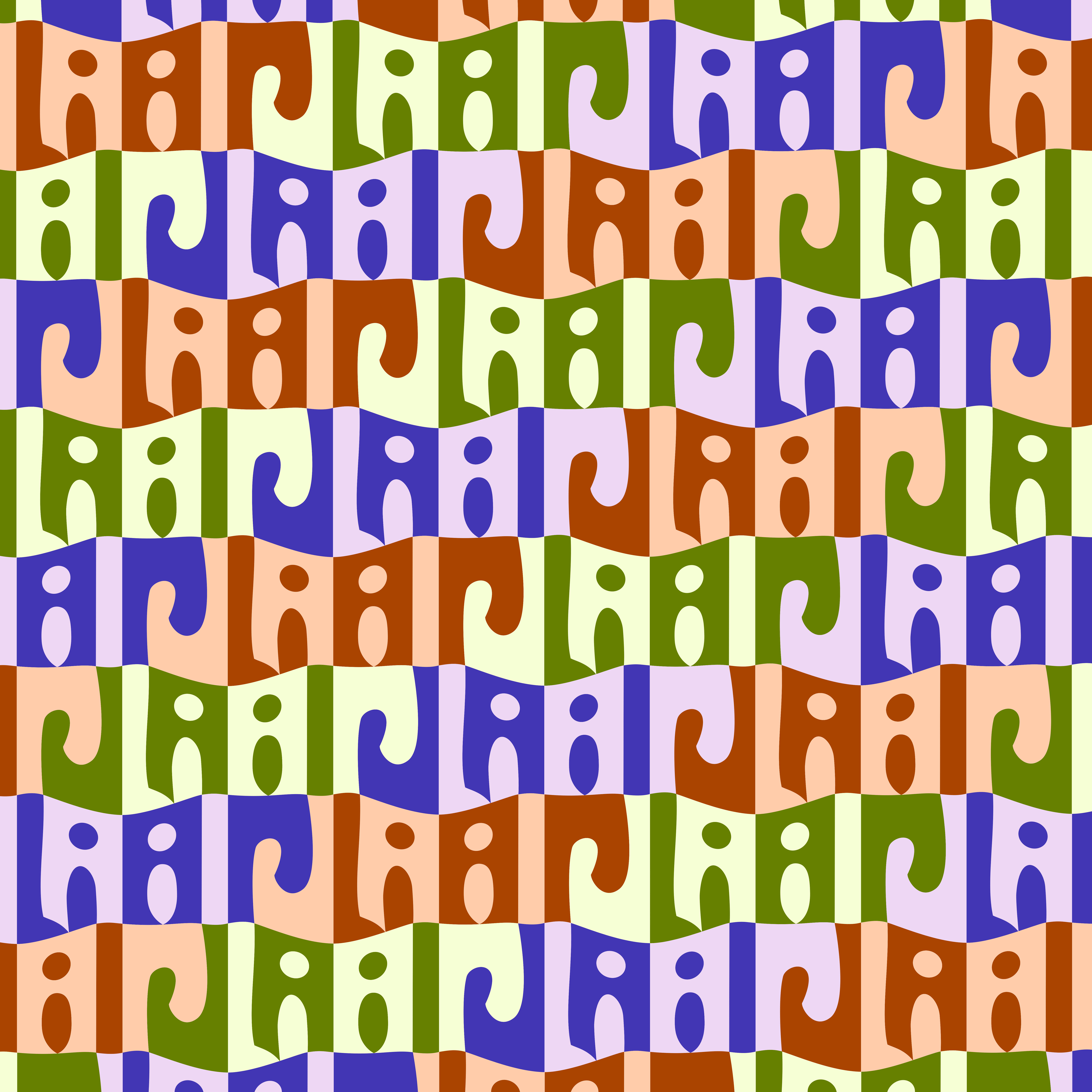
Figure-ground ambigram tessellation displaying the words Liar / Jail alternatively, using negative space.

Figure–ground organization is used to help artists and designers in composition of a 2D piece. Figure–ground reversal may be used as an intentional visual design technique in which an existing image's foreground and background colors are purposely swapped to create new images.

== Non-visual ==
Figure–ground perception can be expanded from visual perception to include non-visual concepts such as melody/harmony, subject/background and positive/negative space. The concept of figure and ground fully depends on the observer and not on the item itself.

In the typical sonic scenarios people encounter, auditory figure and ground signals often overlap in time as well as in frequency content. In these situations, auditory objects are established by integrating sound components both over time and frequency. A 2011 study suggests that the auditory system possesses mechanisms that are sensitive to such cross-frequency and cross-time correlations. Results of this study demonstrated significant activations in the intraparietal sulcus (IPS) and the superior temporal sulcus related to bottom-up, stimulus-driven figure–ground decomposition.

In crowded rooms or parties, a person is able to zero in on the conversation they are having with one person (figure) while drowning out the background noise (ground). This can also be referred to as the "cocktail party effect."

Figure–ground segregation in hearing is not automatic; rather, it requires attention and draws on resources that are shared across vision and audition.

== Types of figure–ground problems ==
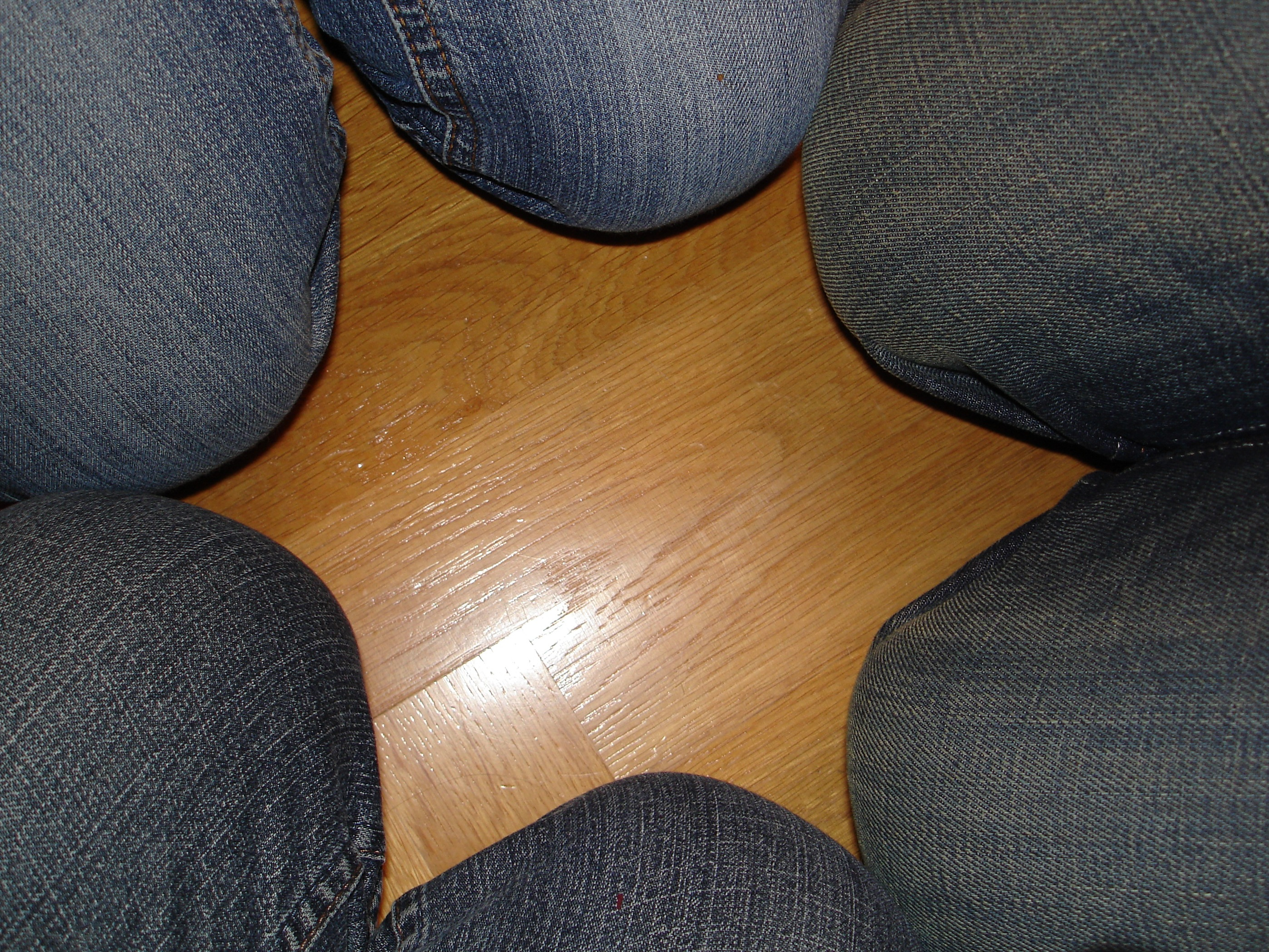
Type 2: The ground itself is the figure.

There are three types of figure–ground problems:

1. The figure and the ground compete.
2. The figure should be the ground and the ground should be the figure.
3. The figure and ground create an optical illusion.

== See also ==
- Composition (visual arts)
- Ma (negative space)
- Negative space
- White space (visual arts)
