= Carroll C. Pratt =

American psychologist and musicologist

Carroll Cornelius Pratt (27 April 1894 – 8 October 1979) was an American psychologist and musicologist. Much of his work centered on the interplay of psychology, music and emotion. He was involved with the experimental psychology and Gestalt psychology movements.

== Early life ==
Carroll Cornelius Pratt was born on 27 April 1894 in North Brookfield, Massachusetts. He received his B.A. (1915), M.A. (1916), and Ph.D. (1921) from Clark University. At Clark, he co-taught several courses with Professor Edwin Boring.

In 1917, he married Marjory Bates Pratt, also an experimental psychology fellow at Clark University. They had two children.

He served in the Army during World War I.

== Career ==
In 1922, he was appointed as an instructor at Harvard University. At Harvard, he continued his focus on experimental psychology, and took an interest in the nascent trend toward operationism. He was made an assistant professor in 1927. During his time at Harvard, he also served as acting organist and choirmaster from 1925-1926.

In 1930, he was awarded an eight-month Guggenheim Fellowship to pursue "investigations into the expressive properties of musical structure by means of methods which are being developed by the Gestalt psychologists in Germany."

In 1937, he was named head of the psychology department at Rutgers University, where he taught until 1945.

During World War II, he served on the Committee for Military Psychology (a group organized by the Emergency Committee of the National Research Council), where he helped draw up psychological guidelines to test "the capacity of men required to man guns, sound detectors and other equipment."

From 1945-1947, he served as the chair of experimental psychology and from 1946-1947 as the acting head of the department of philosophy, psychology, and sociology at the University of Ankara. He was invited to Ankara by the Turkish Education Ministry and Muzafer Sherif (one of Pratt's former graduate students at Harvard University), and was the first visiting professor sent to Turkey under the auspices of the Department of State's Division of Cultural Cooperation.

Upon returning to the United States, he was appointed professor of psychology at Princeton University, where he taught from 1947 to 1962.

After retiring from Princeton, he and his wife moved to Pennington, New Jersey. He served as professor and chair of the psychology department at Rider University from 1963 to 1971.

== Later life ==
He was a member of a number of academic societies: the American Society for Aesthetics, the American Psychological Association, the American Council of Learned Societies, the Society for Asian Music, the American Academy of Arts and Sciences, and the Society of Experimental Psychologists, among others.

He died on 8 October 1979 at the Princeton Medical Center.

== Works ==
- The meaning of music: a study in psychological aesthetics (1931)
- The logic of modern psychology (1939)
- Psychology: the third dimension of war (1942)
- Music as the language of emotion: a lecture delivered in the Whittall Pavilion of the Library of Congress (1950)
