= Reversing type =

White text on dark background

An example of regular (top) and reversing (bottom) text.

Reversing type (also reversing, knocking-out, reversed type) is a method of typographic printing with black or colored inks, in which the entire surface is printed, except for text elements. Reversing is one of the special cases of printing on a color solid, when the color of the solid is black or colored, and the color of the letters is white. This means that the colors of letter background and letters change places. As such, reversing is a meaningfulful way to add emphasis and contrast to the page as well as to develop a visible typographic hierarchy.

== Use in printing ==
Reversing greatly affects a text's readability, so it is most often used for printing headings and for highlighting small fragments of text, preferably with bold emphasis. Quite often it is used as a design technique in advertising.

== Outside the printing industry ==
In the computer industry, the inverted text usually displays a selected block of text, the current menu item. Many older people have a slight, comfortable astigmatism. At the high resolution of modern computer screens, they better see black letters on white background rather than vice versa. Therefore, long reversed texts are rare.

The reversing is widely used in the various equipment design (from television remotes to dump trucks): a half-erased button or plate remains readable.

== See also ==
- Negative space
- Reverse-contrast typefaces
- Type color
