= My Wife and My Mother-in-Law =

Ambiguous image, first published in 1888

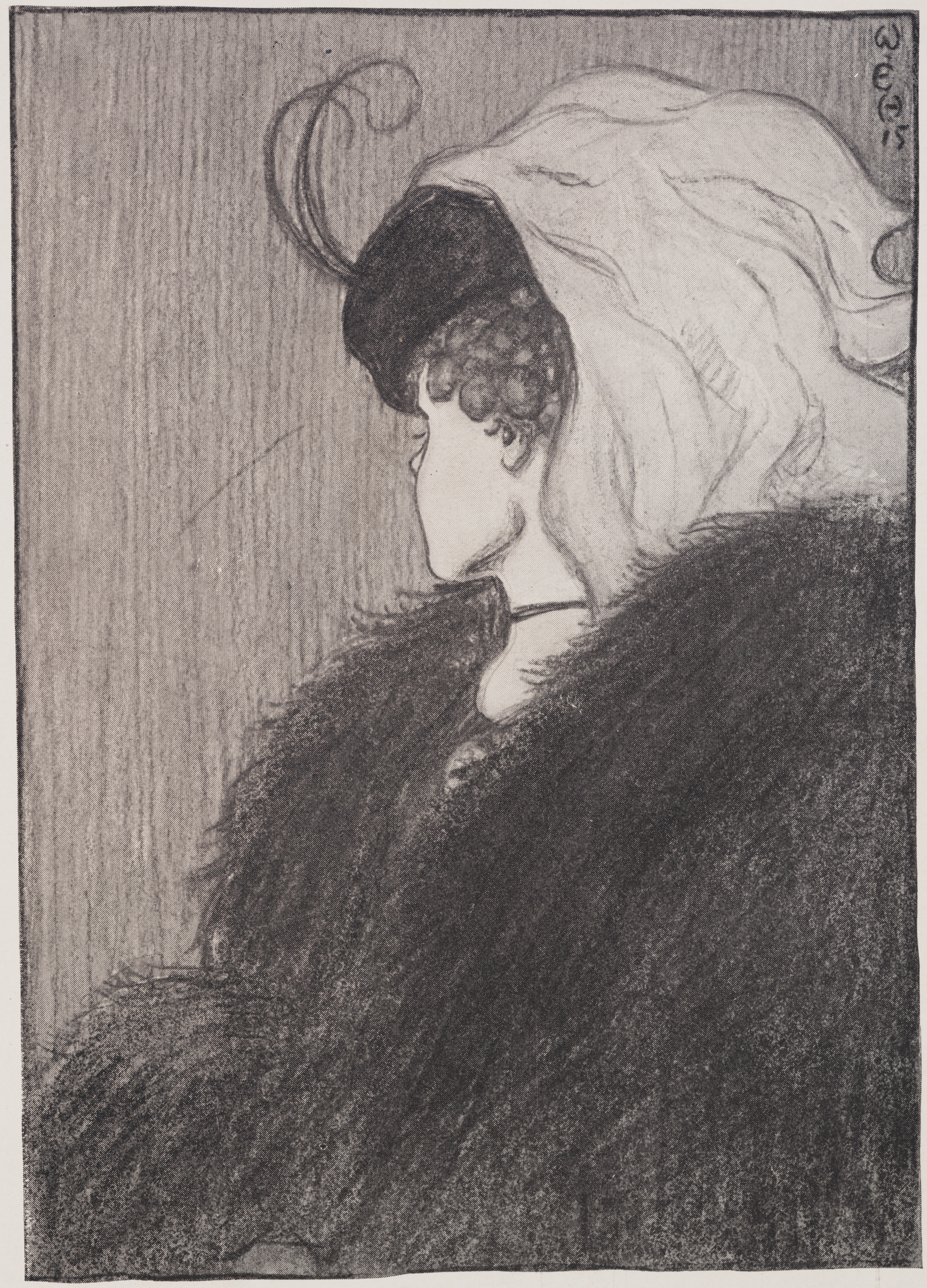
"My Wife and My Mother-in-Law", from 1915 by W. E. Hill

"My Wife and My Mother-in-Law" is a famous ambiguous image, which can be perceived either as a realistic young woman or a cartoonish old woman (the "wife" and the "mother-in-law", respectively). The young woman appears with her face turned away from the viewer while the old woman appears in profile facing the left, so that the part of the drawing that represents the young woman's ear is the old woman's eye; the young woman's chin is the old woman's nose; and the young woman's choker is the old woman's mouth.

== History ==
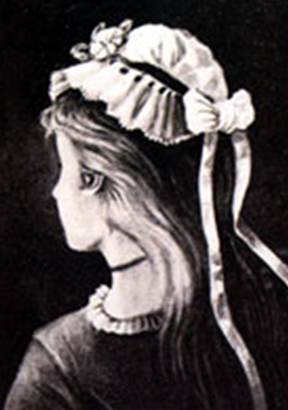
1888 German postcard

American cartoonist William Ely Hill (1887–1962) published "My Wife and My Mother-in-Law" in Puck, an American humour magazine, on 6 November 1915, with the caption "They are both in this picture — Find them". However, the oldest known form of this image is an 1888 German postcard.

In 1930, Edwin Boring introduced the figure to psychologists in a paper titled "A new ambiguous figure", and it has since appeared in textbooks and experimental studies. And then in 1961, Jack Botwinick introduced a new figure with a masculine motif, "Husband and Father-in-Law", which complements Hill's figure.

== See also ==
- Reversible figure
