= Titchener =

Titchener is a surname. Notable people with the surname include:

- Edward B. Titchener (1867–1927) British/American psychologist
  - who popularized the Ebbinghaus optical illusion (also known as Titchener circles)
- Louise Titchener (born 1941), American novelist
- Paul Titchener (born 1941), New Zealand author and local body politician
- for Miss Titchener, see Titchener v British Rlys Board - a Scottish delict case
