= Visual weight =

Balance of visual elements in an image

The visual weight in an image is defined as the visual force that appears due to the contrast of light among the visual elements that compound it.

The visual weight is a visual force which prevails in the image balance. According to Rudolph Arnheim the visual weight, together with the direction are the properties which exercise more influence in the balance of an image.

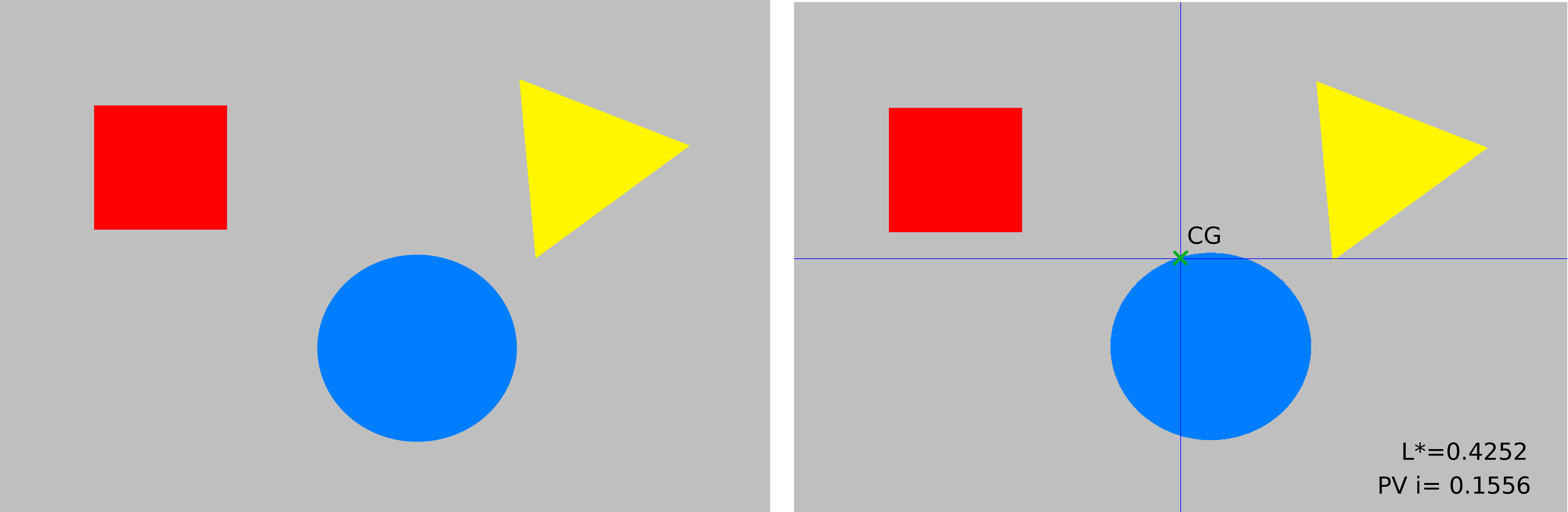
LIGHTNESS, VISUAL WEIGHT AND CENTER OF GRAVITY OF AN IMAGE

The visual weight and the balance of a figure inserted in an image can be determined using the lightness of the figure, the lightness of the ground and their sizes and positions interactions in the composition visual.

We establish that an image is totally balanced when the resultant force is located in the geometric center of the image. When it is located in any of the external borders of the frame then we establish that the image is totally unbalanced. Therefore, the geometric center of an image sets the maximum balance pole and the borders of the frame set the maximum unbalance poles.
