= JLO (disambiguation) =

J.Lo is a nickname for Jennifer Lopez (born 1969), American singer and actress.

JLO may also refer to:

== People ==
- Jason Lo or J Lo (born 1975), Malaysian musician
- João Lourenço, president of Angola
- Justin Longmuir, nicknamed JLo, Australian footballer

== Other uses ==
- J.Lo (album), an album by Jennifer Lopez
- Judgment of Line Orientation
- Junge Landsmannschaft Ostdeutschland
- Juvenile Liaison Officer
- J.Lo, a character in The True Meaning of Smekday

== See also ==
- Jennifer Lopez (disambiguation)
