= Black & White in Colour =

Studio album by Disagree
- Released: October 24, 2026
- Recorded: 2023–2026
- Studios: Studios 301 (Sydney, Australia)
- Genre: Alternative rock
- Label: Virtual Event Platform Asia
- Producer: Greg Henderson

Disagree chronology
To Prevent the Earth from Moving with You (2009)	Black & White in Colour (2026)

Singles from Black & White in Colour
- 1. "Let's Do It All Again" Released: 15 May 2026; 2. "Home" Released: 20 June 2026; 3. "The Lie" Released: 28 July 2026; 4. "Oceans" Released: 18 September 2026; 5. "Stormy" Released: 21 October 2026; 6. "Come Back to Me" Released: 21 November 2026

Black & White in Colour is the third studio album by Malaysian rock band, Disagree, released on 24 October 2026 by Virtual Event Platform Asia. It is their first studio album in 17 years since To Prevent the Earth from Moving with You (2009), following their reunion in mid 2023, marking the longest gap between studio albums in the band's career.

The album's overall sound marks a return to the alt-grunge style the band became famous for in the 2000s. Black & White in Colour is the first Disagree album to use the original band logo since At the End of the Day from 2004 and their first release as a trio. Six singles were released from the album, with "Let's Do It All Again" as the main single.

== Background and recording ==
Following the release of their second studio album, To Prevent the Earth from Moving with You, which received commercial failure and lackluster sales, Disagree went on a long hiatus from their music career, of which all band members focused on their family and work commitments though there were no announcement was made beforehand and during their absence, they did not released any studio albums and singles. Disagree had reformed in 2023, during a period in which the band had been reduced to three members with the addition of Taa as the current bassist, replacing two former band members Aziz and David, and officially made their comeback in May 2026 and announced that they had already record songs for their upcoming third album, entitled Black & White in Colour.

For the album, Disagree envisioned Black & White in Colour as a double album by included 21 songs, making them the first rock band in Malaysia to release a double album of original material. "The Lie", the album's third single, intended to be the last track in the album, but band decided to include more 9 songs in order to make it as a double album. One of the tracks in the album, "Who We Are II", serve as the sequel of "Who We Are", which was included in To Prevent the Earth from Moving with You.

The album was recorded primarily at Studios 301 in Sydney, Australia though some of the tracks also recorded in the band's native Malaysia. The album was produced and mixed by Greg Henderson and mastered by Leon Zervos. The album would be Disagree's first release under their own management, Virtual Event Platform Asia, after having previously been signed to Jason Lo's Fat Boys Records.

== Themes ==
The themes of the album are complex themes of trauma, faith, and the cyclical nature of life. According to the band, each track reflects a different stage of their evolution; from who they were, to what they lost and what they are becoming.

== Artwork ==
The album cover using red background and shows a photo of a respiratory mask and a small animal footprint. In the booklet, there are also images of 21 animal artworks, which represent each songs. For example, a penguin represents "Stormy", a grizzly bear represents "Lost Forever", a giant killer whale representing "Oceans", and a mosquito representing "Elegy for a Dream". The album's packaging were rendered in a book-styled format while the CDs rendered in a vinyl-styled format.

== Release and promotion ==
Black & White in Colour was released on 24 October 2026. To promote the album, the band will performs most of the songs in the album as well as songs from their first two albums at their Black & White in Colour Showcase, their first live performance in 15 years, at the REXKL. The album's merchandise will be made available during the showcase.

=== Singles ===
The first single to be released from the album was "Let's Do It All Again" on 15 May 2026 with a music video was filmed to promote the single, featuring various vintage band footage. "Home", "The Lie" and "Oceans" were released as further singles and made into music videos. The music video for "Home" features footages of Israeli attacks on Palestine, while music videos for "The Lie" and "Oceans" was shot in the Philippines. The story in "The Lie" was concluded in "Oceans" music video. The fifth single, "Stormy" was released on 21 October 2026 with an accompanying music video using black-and-white shade. On 21 November, "Come Back to Me" was released as the album's sixth single.

== Track listing ==
All lyrics are written by Mohamed Zahid Yon; all music is composed by Disagree.

Wave I: Black & White
No.	Title	Length
1.	"Today! Today!"
2.	"The Lovely Way You Are"
3.	"Stormy"	4:16
4.	"What Love Can Do"
5.	"All I Want Is You"
6.	"Who We Are II"
7.	"Home"	3:37
8.	"Sorry Jones"
9.	"Lost Forever"
10.	"My Calamity"

Wave II: Colour
No.	Title	Length
11.	"I Will Love You"
12.	"The Lie"	4:24
13.	"Another Night in Knots"
14.	"Across the Atlantic"
15.	"Oceans"	5:57
16.	"Let's Do It All Again"	3:46
17.	"Princess Julia"
18.	"Broken Hearts"
19.	"Elegy for a Dream"
20.	"Come Back to Me"	4:16
21.	"The End"
