= UPB-MyTeam F.C. =

Malaysian football club

UPB-MyTeam FC
- Full name: UPB-MyTeam Football Club
- Nickname: The Revolution
- Founded: 2004; 22 years ago as UPB-Jendarata FC; 2006; 20 years ago as UPB-MyTeam FC
- Dissolved: 2009; 17 years ago
| Home colours | Away colours |

UPB-MyTeam Football Club is a defunct Malaysian football club which formerly competed in the top tier of Malaysian football, the Malaysia Super League. The team's home stadium was the Stadium MBPJ, in Petaling Jaya.

The club as it exists today was the result of a merger of UPB Football Club and MyTeam (a football team created through the Malaysian reality TV show MyTeam) prior to the 2006–07 Malaysian football season.

== History ==
Launched in 2006, the TV3 reality TV series MyTeam brought together a squad of soccer players from around Malaysia with no professional playing experience known as "MyTeam". The show followed the team as it was selected through trials and then trained and coached by the former Malaysian international footballer Shebby Singh, before taking on the Malaysia national football team in an exhibition match. MyTeam lost 2–1 to the national team in the exhibition game on 28 May 2006. The show generated considerable interest. MyTeam was subsequently invited to join the Malaysia Premier League for the 2006–07 season.

UPB FC was an ailing football club sponsored by the Malaysian United Plantations Berhad (UPB) company, based in Teluk Intan, Perak. (When it was first formed, the club had been known as Jenderata FC.) The club was poised to "go the way of the dinosaur" before the politician Khairy Jamaluddin, who along with radio DJ Jason Lo was the co-creator and Executive Producer of the MyTeam series, decided to take over the club and form a base for MyTeam to become a professional competitive team. The name UPB-MyTeam FC was adopted upon UPB FC's management's request (however it has been speculated that the "UPB" will be dropped from the club's name at some point in the future). Khairy Jamaluddin and Jason Lo became the club's President and Deputy President, and Bojan Hodak of Croatia was hired to become the team's coach.

UPB MyTeam FC finished the 2006–07 Malaysia Premier League season as runners-up behind PDRM FA, and as a result were promoted to the Malaysia Super League 2007-08 season.

A second season of the reality TV show, MyTeam2, was broadcast in 2007 (MyTeam2 took on the Indonesian national football team, losing 2–0). Three players from MyTeam2 (Muhamad Noor Hassan, Mohan a/l R. Azmi and Mohd Hisham Hashim) have joined the UPB MyTeam FC squad for the 2007–08 Malaysian Super League season.

UPB MyTeam FC held a trial on 1 and 2 November 2008 at Stadium Bukit Jalil to select 17 players for the 2008 President Cup. Unfortunately, after a period of financial struggle, the club was dissolved at the end of 2009 season. Currently, the club management has decided rebuilt to the club with the same name and reported to join the Selangor FAS State League in 2013.

== Honours ==
| Title | Winners | Runners-up |
|---|---|---|
| Division 1/Premier 1/Premier League | | 2007 (1x) |

== Officials ==
Club Management (2007–08)

| Name | Nationality | Role |
|---|---|---|
| Khairy Jamaluddin Abu Bakar | (Malaysia) | President/Chairman |
| Jason Lo | (Malaysia) | Deputy President/Vice Chairman & Team Manager |
| Ruben Emir Gnanalingam | (Malaysia) | Vice President |
| Martin Bek-Nielsen | (Denmark) / (Malaysia) | Vice President |
| Muhammad Yakub Hussaini | (Malaysia) | Vice President & Assistant Manager |
| Dax Muhamad | (Malaysia) | General Secretary |
| Al-Naliq Hasmi | (Malaysia) | Assistant General Secretary |
| T. Kunaseelan | (Malaysia) | General Secretary (Presidents Cup Team) |
| Aqliff Shane Casey | (Malaysia) | Honorary Treasurer |
| Safirul Azli Abu Bakar | (Malaysia) | Media Officer |
| Ismail Ibrahim | (Malaysia) | Inventory Manager |
| Shamim Imran | (Malaysia) | Match Analyst |
| Herman Antoni | (Indonesia) | Kit Man |

Technical Staff (2007–08)

| Name | Nationality | Role |
|---|---|---|
| Jason Lo | (Malaysia) | Team Manager |
| Bojan Hodak | (Croatia) | Head Coach |
| Khan Hung Meng | (Malaysia) | Assistant Head Coach |
| Abdul Rashid Hassan | (Malaysia) | Goalkeepers Coach |
| Luiz Pablo Pozzuto | (Argentina) | Trainer/Motivator/Analyst |
| Jacob Joseph | (Malaysia) | Presidents Cup Team Coach |
| Mohd Azrilreza Azman | (Malaysia) | Physiotherapist |

== Honours ==
| Title | Winners | Runners-up |
|---|---|---|
| Division 1/Premier 1/Premier League | | 2007 (1x) |

== Coaches ==
| Period | Coach |
|---|---|
| 2006–09 | (Croatia) Bojan Hodak |

== See also ==
- MyTeam (Malaysian TV series)
- UPB (United Plantations Berhad) FC
