= Benton Visual Retention Test =

- Synonyms: Benton test
- ICD-9-CM: 94.02

The Benton Visual Retention Test (or simply Benton test or BVRT) is an individually administered test for people aged from eight years to adulthood that measures visual perception and visual memory. It can also be used to help identify possible learning disabilities among other conditions that might affect an individual's memory. The individual examined is shown ten designs, one at a time, and asked to reproduce each one as exactly as possible on plain paper from memory. The test is untimed, and the results are professionally scored by form, shape, pattern, and arrangement on the paper.

== History ==
Arthur Benton was a psychologist who worked with neurologist Morris Bender during his military assignment to the San Diego Naval Hospital. His experiences in the treatment of servicemen who had traumatic brain injuries led to his development of the Benton Visual Retention Test. Dr. Benton developed the test to provide a shorter assessment for immediate nonverbal memory to supplement the popular digit span test, and selected a format that was resistant to both emotional and subject-tester influence. The test was published in 1946, and is now currently in its 5th edition.

== Testing ==
=== Test format ===
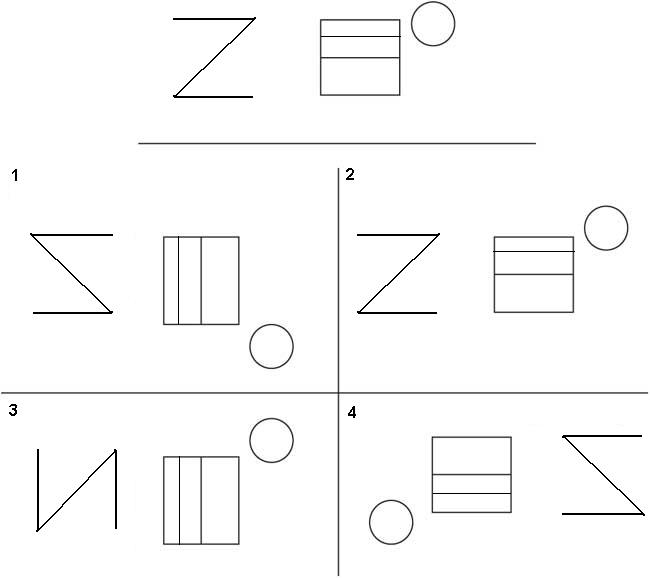
A sample design used in Administration M of the Benton Test. The original design is shown at the top, and after a delay, the four design choices are shown and the subject is asked to choose the one that best matches the original design.

The Benton Visual Retention Test is composed of 3 sets, or forms, of 10 designs (each 8.5 × 5.5 in.) that measure the examinee's visual and memory abilities as well as a set of alternate designs for repeated tests. The examinee is given a booklet containing 10 blank pages on which they reproduce the designs. These design are used to gauge the examinee's visual perception and memory, and can be administered five different ways. These five methods are as follows:

Method Type	Description
A	The examinee views each design for 10 seconds before reproducing them
B	The examinee views each design for 5 seconds before reproducing them
C	The examinee views each design and is allowed to reproduce them while viewing the designs for an indefinite amount of time
D	The examinee views each design for 10 seconds, and then waits 15 seconds before reproduction begins
M	The examinee views each design for 10 seconds, and then chooses the correct design from a multiple choice of four displays

In every method except for Administration C, the original design is hidden before reproduction begins.

=== Test scoring ===
The test can be scored two ways. First method: The number of correct score is calculated based on an all-or-nothing approach; points are awarded if the reproduction of the design matches the original. Second method: The number of error score, on the other hand, is calculated based on the number and type of errors made for each design. The major categories for these errors are omissions, distortions, perseverations, rotations, misplacements, and size errors. These scores are then compared to several sets of normative data available in the manual, each representing different demographic characteristics, and conclusions can be drawn by the examiner. The two different methods of scoring allow for both quantitative and qualitative analysis of an individual's test.

== Uses ==
The Benton Test is sensitive to many forms of brain impairments and diseases, but it is difficult to diagnose a particular disease through the test. In fact, according to the test manual, a high number of a single category of error should not be used as a diagnosis, but should lead to further testing. High amounts of perseverations, for example, suggests frontal lobe damage, while the omission of peripheral designs suggests potential brain trauma, especially in the right parietal lobe. Overall performance does not seem to distinguish those with unilateral left or right hemisphere damage. Nevertheless, examiners have shown to be able to discriminate among perceptual, memory, and motor impairments based on analysis of the test results. Dementia, brain lesions, thalamic stroke, and Alzheimer's disease are among the conditions that have been shown to greatly reduce an individual's BVRT score. Both the copy and memory versions of the test are especially sensitive to dementia, and may help identify individuals who are at risk for developing Alzheimer's later. In addition, learning disabilities among children are able to be identified through the Benton Test. In 1983, the Benton Test was included in the Neurobehavioral Core Test Battery (NCTB) to identify the effects of chemical exposure on the nervous system and has since been used to assess chemical exposure in the workplace. From its use in the NCTB, the Benton Test has shown sensitivity to various chemical exposures, including mercury exposure, lead exposure, and pesticide exposure.

== Psychometric properties ==
According to the Benton Test manual, test-retest reliability of the Benton Test is 0.85, and alternate form reliabilities range from 0.79 to 0.84. Correlation between immediate and delayed memory recall (Administration type A and D, respectively) ranges from 0.40 to 0.83, depending on the combinations of forms used. Included with the manual are standardized results for children, adolescents, and adults, though each administration method have their own standardization data. Total errors on the test have been shown to increase with age, especially after the age of 70.

== Criticisms and validity ==
The Benton Test has been criticized by test's requirement of the examinee's IQ or estimated IQ, which can be difficult to obtain if the examinee is in a poor condition. In addition, data from studies that look at the viability of retesting a patient have shown conflicting results; some studies show no difference in scores after time has passed between two tests, while other studies show a difference. Despite these reports, the Benton Test has several advantages over other tests of visual memory. These include: a more explicit scoring system than other tests, parallel-forms reliability due to the presence of multiple form sets, and short administration time. Because of this, the BVRT is still widely used today for a large number of clinical conditions.

== See also ==
- Judgment of Line Orientation
