= Arthur Benton =

Arthur Benton may refer to:

- Arthur Lester Benton (1909–2006), American neuropsychologist
- Arthur Burnett Benton (1858–1927), American architect
