= To Prevent the Earth from Moving with You =

Studio album by Disagree
- Released: June 30, 2009
- Recorded: 2006–2009
- Studios: Synchrosound Studios (Petaling Jaya, Selangor)
- Genre: Alternative rock
- Length: 42:43
- Label: Fat Boys Records
- Producers: Jason Lo, Disagree

Disagree chronology
At the End of the Day (2004)	To Prevent the Earth from Moving with You (2009)	Black & White in Colour (2026)

Singles from To Prevent the Earth from Moving with You
- 1. "Osaka" Released: 2009; 2. "Haley" Released: 2009; 3. "The Tiniest Moment" Released: 2010

To Prevent the Earth from Moving with You is the second studio album by Malaysian rock band, Disagree, released on June 30, 2009 by Fat Boys Records. Three singles were released from the album.

== Production ==
To Prevent the Earth from Moving with You was second studio album from Disagree, which was highly anticipated after the success of their debut studio album, At the End of the Day (2004). The album took four years to completed and was co-produced by Jason Lo and the band.

The album's cover art photography was designed by Malaysian comic artist and illustrator, Sarah Joan Mokhtar. The album cover features a red giant whale and a boy sitting above the whale. In the booklet, there are also multiple images, also drawn by Sarah Joan, which represented each songs in the album.

To Prevent the Earth from Moving with You is the last album Disagree recorded and released under Fat Boys Records and after which, the band's contract with the label ended and they entered a hiatus two years later. It is also their last album to use the new Disagree logo before they reunited and reverted to their original logo. The band would not record any singles and studio albums until 2026 when they reunited for the first time for their third album, Black & White in Colour.

== Release and reception ==
The album was released on 30 June 2009 to popular success. "Osaka" and "Haley" was released as the main singles and made into music videos. "The Tiniest Moment", the album's opening track, was released as further singles. It also earned Disagree won the Best Album Cover and the Best Local English Album categories as well as nominated for the Best Local English Song and Best Music Video categories at the 17th edition of Anugerah Industri Muzik.

== Track listing ==
No.	Title	Length
1.	"The Tiniest Moment"	3:34
2.	"The Greatest Fall"	4:17
3.	"The One"	4:21
4.	"Givers"	4:21
5.	"Osaka"	2:45
6.	"Haley"	3:09
7.	"Hero"	3:55
8.	"Immune"	3:45
9.	"The Wreck"	3:08
10.	"Who We Are"	4:10
11.	"Goodbye"	2:50
12.	"Cold Day December"	4:11
Total length:		42:43

== Personnel ==
- Zahid – vocals, lead guitar
- Hamka – drums
- Aziz – bass
- David – rhythm guitar
- Jason Lo – producer
- Sarah Joan Mokhtar – album cover designer

== Awards ==
Award	Year	Recipient(s) and nominee(s)	Category	Result	Ref(s)
Anugerah Industri Muzik	2010	To Prevent the Earth from Moving with You	Best Album Cover	Won	
Anugerah Industri Muzik	2010	To Prevent the Earth from Moving with You	Best Local English Album	Won	
Anugerah Industri Muzik	2010	"Osaka"	Best Local English Song	Nominated	
Anugerah Industri Muzik	2010	"Osaka"	Best Music Video	Nominated	
Anugerah Industri Muzik	2010	"Haley"	Best Local English Song	Nominated	
Anugerah Industri Muzik	2010	"Haley"	Best Music Video	Nominated	

== Release history ==
Release history
Region	Date	Format(s)	Label	Ref.
Malaysia	June 30, 2009	CD; cassette; music download; streaming	Fat Boys Records	
