= Disagree =

Disagree may refer to:

- Argument, failure to agree.
- Disagree (band) is a Malaysian rock band.
