= Ernst Mach =

Austrian physicist, philosopher and university educator (1838–1916)

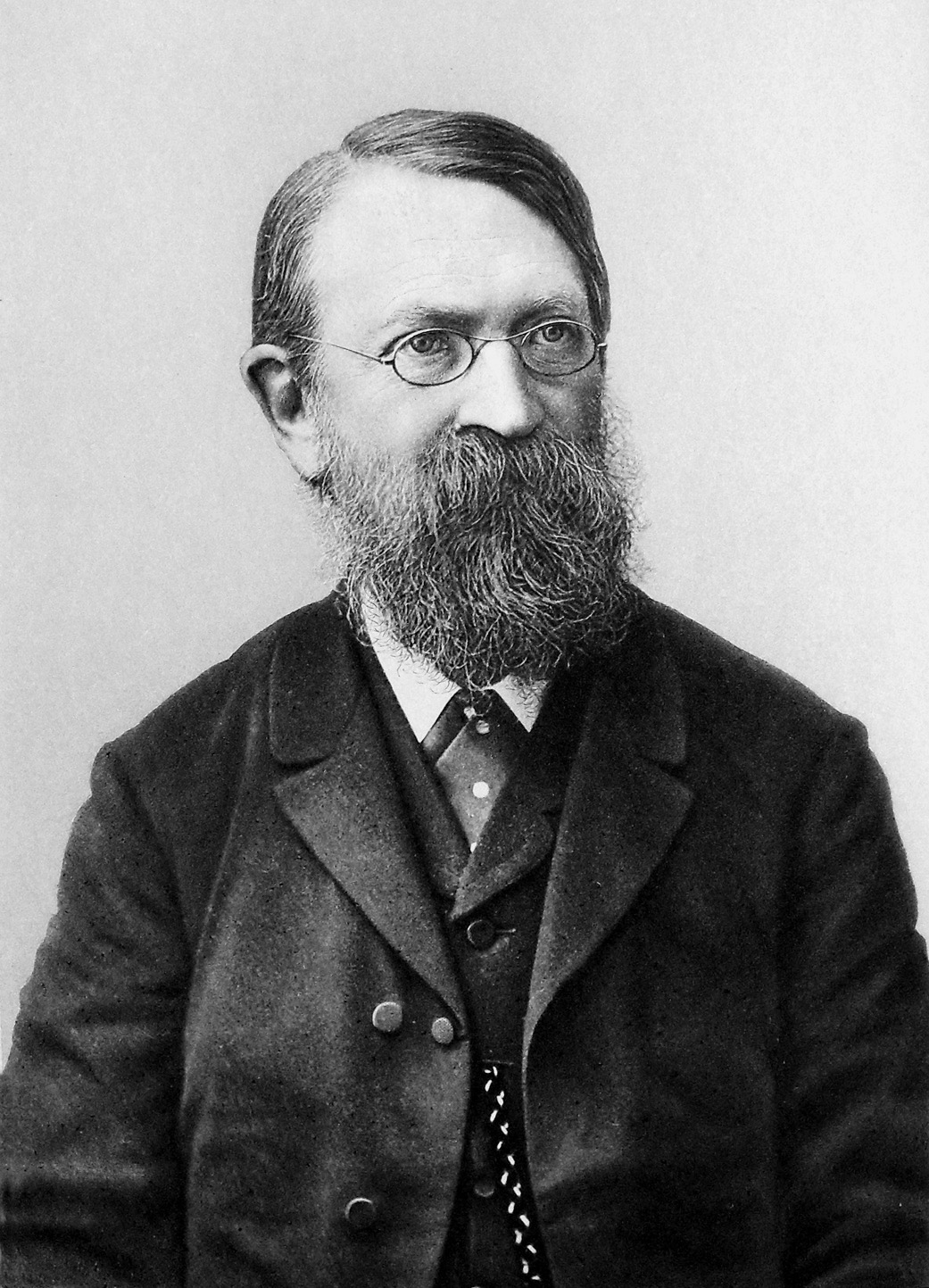
- Born: Ernst Waldfried Josef Wenzel Mach; 18 February 1838; Brno, Moravia, Austrian Empire
- Died: 19 February 1916 (aged 78); Vaterstetten, Bavaria, German Empire
- Education: University of Vienna (Ph.D., 1860; Dr. phil. hab., 1861)
- Known for: Mach band; Mach diamonds; Mach number; Mach reflection; Mach wave; Mach's principle; Criticism of Newton's bucket argument; Empirio-criticism; Oblique effect; Relationalism; Shock waves; Stereokinetic stimulus
- Children: Ludwig Mach
- Scientific career
- Fields: Physicist
- Workplaces: University of Graz; Charles-Ferdinand University (Prague); University of Vienna
- Thesis: Über elektrische Ladungen und Induktion (1860)
- Doctoral advisor: Andreas von Ettingshausen
- Doctoral students: Heinrich Gomperz; Ottokar Tumlirz
- Other notable students: Andrija Mohorovičić

Notes
- He was the godfather of Wolfgang Pauli.

Ernst Waldfried Josef Wenzel Mach (/mɑːk/ MAHK; Austrian German: [ˈɛrnst ˈmax]; 18 February 1838 – 19 February 1916) was an Austrian physicist and philosopher who contributed to the understanding of the physics of shock waves. The ratio of the speed of a flow or object to that of sound is named the Mach number in his honor. As a philosopher of science, he was a major influence on logical positivism and American pragmatism. Through his criticism of Isaac Newton's theories of space and time, he foreshadowed Albert Einstein's theory of relativity.

== Biography ==
=== Early life ===
Mach was born in Chrlice (German: Chirlitz), Moravia, Austrian Empire (now part of Brno in the Czech Republic). His father Jan Nepomuk Mach, who had graduated from Charles-Ferdinand University in Prague, acted as tutor to the noble Brethon family in Zlín in eastern Moravia. His grandfather Wenzl Lanhaus, an administrator of the Chirlitz estate, was also master builder of the streets there. His activities in that field later influenced Ernst Mach's theoretical work. Some sources give Mach's birthplace as Tuřany (German: Turas, also part of Brno), the site of the Chirlitz registry office. It was there that Mach was baptized by Peregrin Weiss. Mach later became a socialist and an atheist, but his theory and life were sometimes compared to Buddhism. Heinrich Gomperz called Mach the "Buddha of Science" because of his phenomenalist approach to the "Ego" in his Analysis of Sensations.

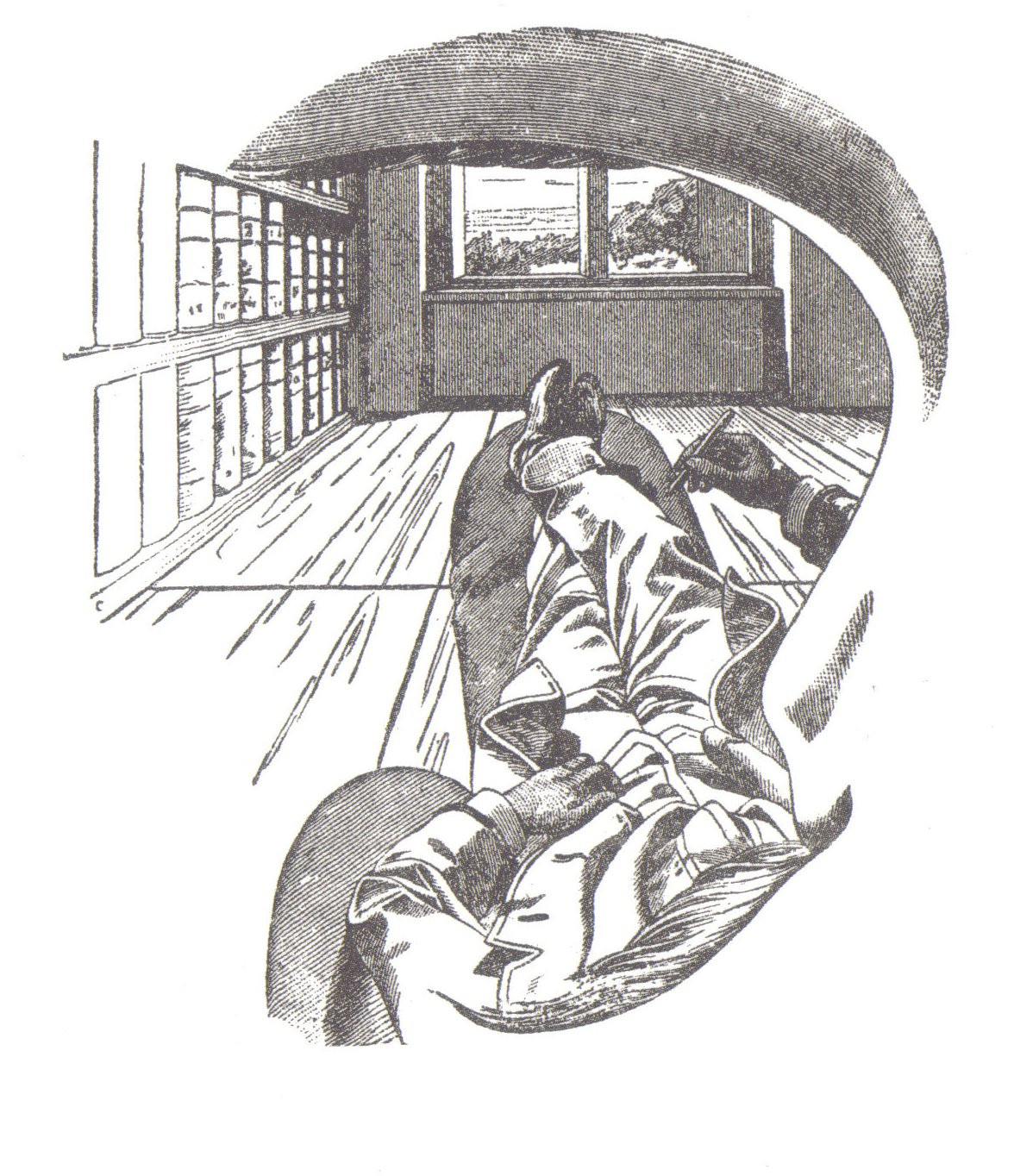
Self-Portrait by Ernst Mach (1886) featured in "Analysis of Sensations", also known as "view from the left eye"

Up to the age of 14, Mach was educated at home by his parents. He then entered a gymnasium in Kroměříž (German: Kremsier), where he studied for three years. In 1855, he became a student at the University of Vienna, where he studied physics and for one semester medical physiology, receiving a doctorate in physics in 1860 under Andreas von Ettingshausen, with his thesis Über elektrische Ladungen und Induktion and his habilitation the following year. His early work focused on the Doppler effect in optics and acoustics.

=== Professional research ===
In 1864, Mach became professor of mathematics at the University of Graz after having declined a chair in surgery at the University of Salzburg. In 1866, he was appointed professor of physics. During this period, Mach continued his work in psycho-physics and in sensory perception. In 1867, he took the chair of experimental physics at Charles-Ferdinand University, where he stayed for 28 years before returning to Vienna. In 1871, he was elected a member of the Royal Bohemian Society of Sciences.

Mach's main contribution to physics involved his description and photographs of spark shock-waves and then ballistic shock-waves. He described how when a bullet or shell moved faster than the speed of sound, it created a compression of air in front of it. Using schlieren photography, he and his son Ludwig photographed the shadows of the invisible shock waves. During the early 1890s, Ludwig invented a modification of the Jamin interferometer that allowed for much clearer photographs. But Mach also made many contributions to psychology and physiology, including his anticipation of gestalt phenomena, his discovery of the oblique effect and of Mach bands, an inhibition-influenced type of visual illusion, and especially his discovery of a non-acoustic function of the inner ear that helps control human balance.

One of the best-known of Mach's ideas is the so-called Mach principle, the physical origin of inertia. This was never written down by Mach but was given a graphic verbal form, attributed by Philipp Frank to Mach: "When the subway jerks, it's the fixed stars that throw you down."

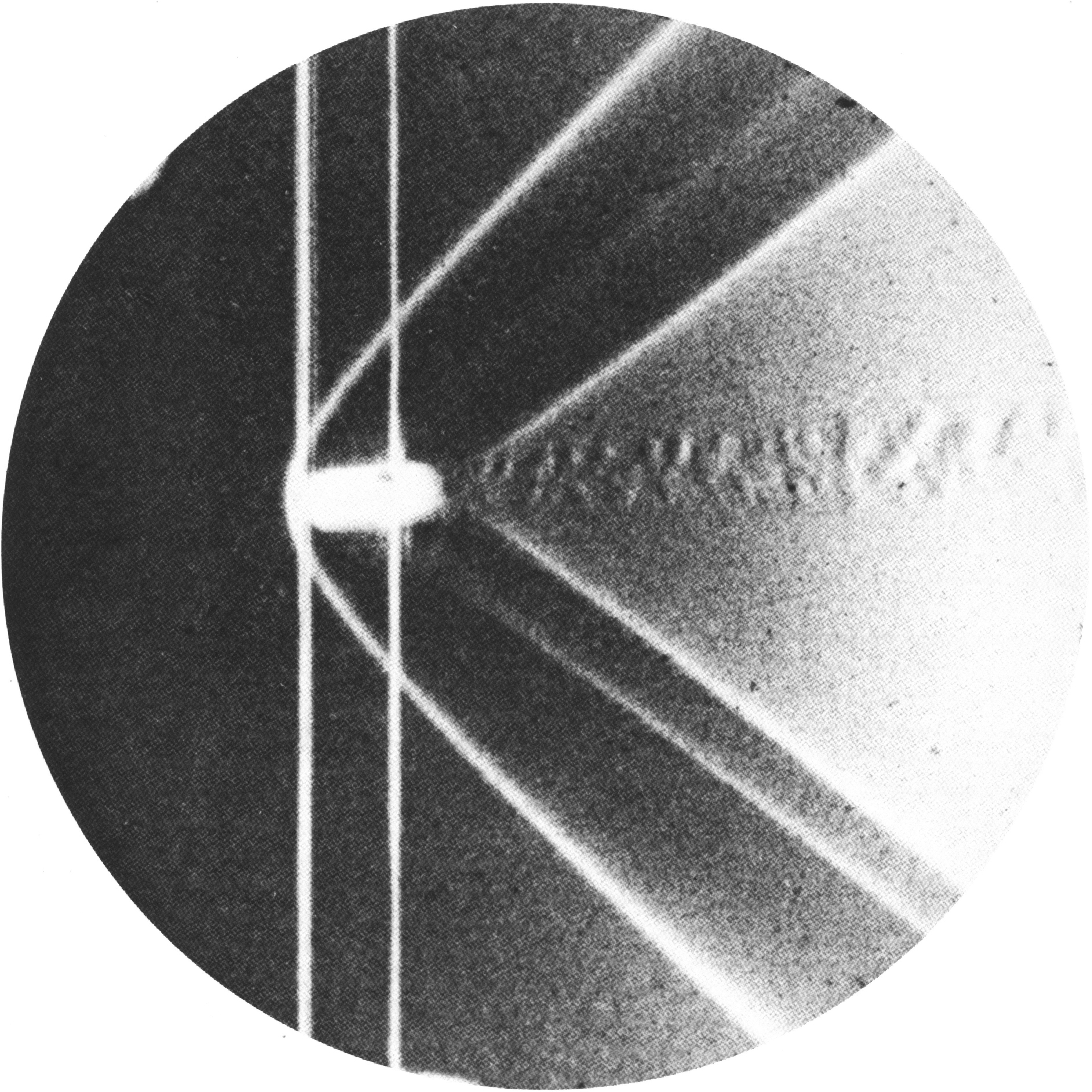
Ernst Mach's historic 1887 photograph (shadowgraph) of a bow shockwave around a supersonic bullet fired from a Werndl carbine.

In 1900, Mach became godfather of physicist Wolfgang Ernst Pauli, who was also named after him.

Mach was also well-known for his philosophy, developed in close interplay with his science. (Note: On this interdependency of Mach's physics, physiology, history and philosophy of science see Blackmore 1972, Blackmore (ed.) 1992 and Hentschel 1985 against Paul Feyerabend's efforts to decouple these three strands.) He defended a type of phenomenalism, recognizing only sensations as real. That position seemed incompatible with the view of atoms and molecules as external, mind-independent things. After an 1897 lecture by Ludwig Boltzmann at the Imperial Academy of Science in Vienna, Mach said, "I don't believe that atoms exist!"

In 1898, Mach survived a paralytic stroke, and in 1901, he retired from the University of Vienna and was appointed to the upper chamber of the Austrian Parliament. On leaving Vienna in 1913, he moved to his son's home in Vaterstetten, near Munich, where he continued writing and corresponding until his death in 1916, one day after his 78th birthday.

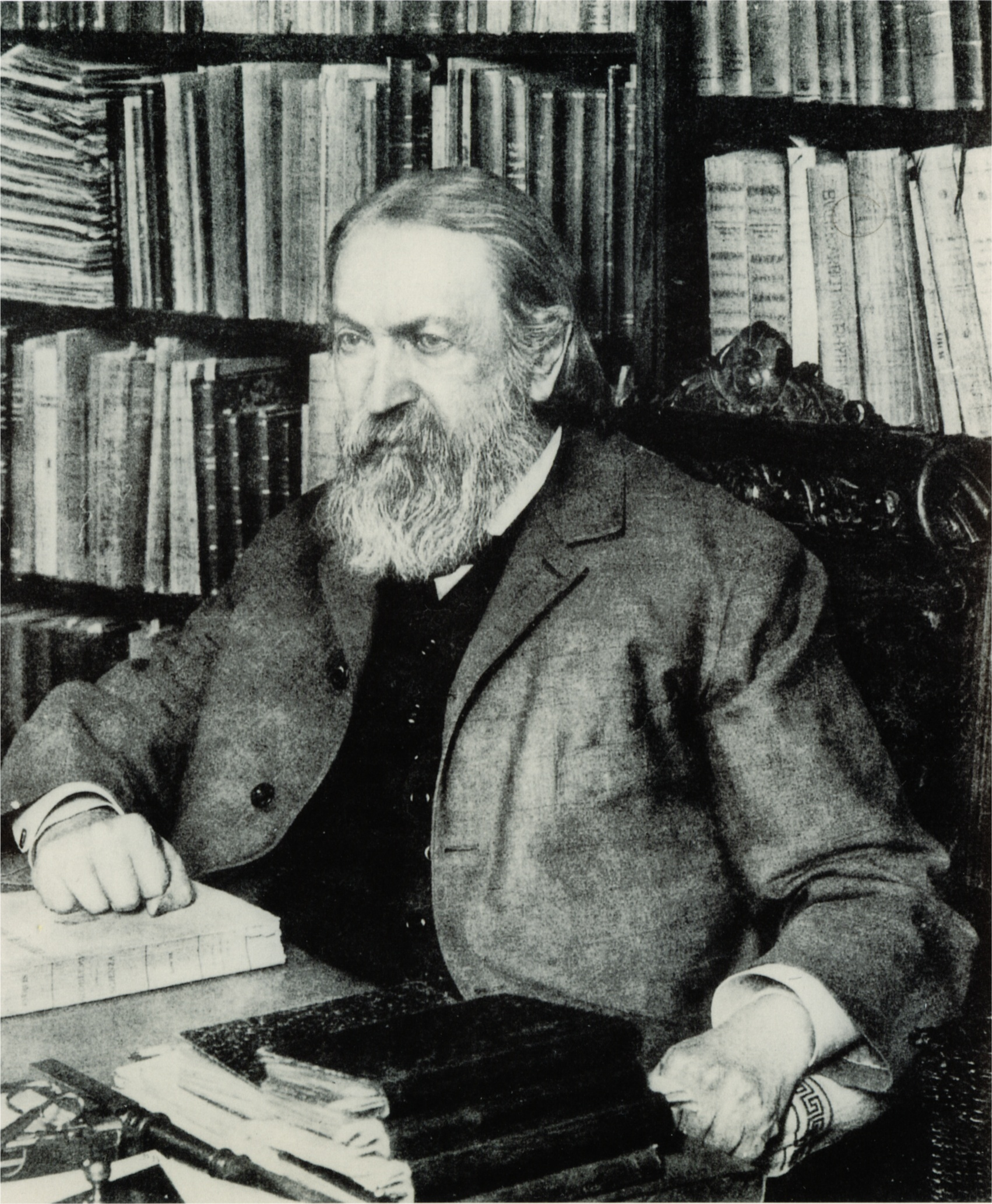
Ernst Mach in 1905

=== Politics ===
Born to a liberal family, Mach lamented that a "very reactionary-clerical" period followed the 1848 revolutions, prompting him to plan to emigrate to America, although he never did.

In 1901, Mach accepted an appointment to the Austrian House of Lords but declined ennoblement because he thought it inappropriate for a scientist. He was on good personal terms with the Social Democrat politician Viktor Adler and left money in his will to the Social Democrat newspaper Arbeiter-Zeitung.

Mach was critical of the European powers' colonial conquests, saying that they "will constitute...the most distasteful chapter of history for coming generations".

== Physics ==
Most of Mach's initial studies in experimental physics concentrated on the interference, diffraction, polarization and refraction of light in different media under external influences. From there followed explorations in supersonic fluid mechanics. Mach and physicist-photographer Peter Salcher presented their paper on this subject in 1887; it correctly describes the sound effects observed during the supersonic motion of a projectile. They deduced and experimentally confirmed the existence of a shock wave of conical shape, with the projectile at the apex. The ratio of the speed of a fluid to the local speed of sound v_{p}/v_{s} is called the Mach number after him. It is a critical parameter in the description of high-speed fluid movement in aerodynamics and hydrodynamics. Mach also contributed to cosmology the hypothesis known as Mach's principle.

== Philosophy of science ==
=== Empirio-criticism ===
From 1895 to 1901, Mach held a newly created chair for "the history and philosophy of the inductive sciences" at the University of Vienna. (Note: On Mach's historiography, cf., e.g., Hentschel 1988 on his impact in Vienna, see Stadler et al. (1988), and Blackmore et al. (2001).) In his historico-philosophical studies, Mach developed a phenomenalistic philosophy of science that became influential in the 19th and 20th centuries, empirio-criticism, a rigorously positivist and radically empiricist philosophy established by the German philosopher Richard Avenarius and further developed by Mach, Joseph Petzoldt, and others, according to which all we can know is our sensations.

Mach originally saw scientific laws as summaries of experimental events, constructed for the purpose of making complex data comprehensible, but later emphasized mathematical functions as a more useful way to describe sensory appearances. Thus, scientific laws, while somewhat idealized, have more to do with describing sensations than with reality as it exists beyond sensations:

The goal which it (physical science) has set itself is the simplest and most economical abstract expression of facts.

When the human mind, with its limited powers, attempts to mirror in itself the rich life of the world, of which it itself is only a small part, and which it can never hope to exhaust, it has every reason for proceeding economically.

In reality, the law always contains less than the fact itself, because it does not reproduce the fact as a whole but only in that aspect of it which is important for us, the rest being intentionally or from necessity omitted.

In mentally separating a body from the changeable environment in which it moves, what we really do is to extricate a group of sensations on which our thoughts are fastened and which is of relatively greater stability than the others, from the stream of all our sensations.

Suppose we were to attribute to nature the property of producing like effects in like circumstances; just these like circumstances we should not know how to find. Nature exists once only. Our schematic mental imitation alone produces like events. (Note: Selections are taken from his essay The Economical Nature of Physical Inquiry, excerpted by Kockelmans and slightly corrected by Blackmore. (citation below).)

Mach's positivism influenced many Russian Marxists, such as Alexander Bogdanov. In 1908, Lenin wrote a philosophical work, Materialism and Empirio-criticism, in which he criticized Machism and the views of "Russian Machists". His main criticisms were that Mach's philosophy led to solipsism and to the absurd conclusion that nature did not exist before humans:

If bodies are "complexes of sensations," as Mach says, or "combinations of sensations," as Berkeley said, it inevitably follows that the whole world is but my idea. Starting from such a premise it is impossible to arrive at the existence of other people besides oneself: it is the purest solipsism. ...if [Mach] does not admit that the "sensible content" is an objective reality, existing independently of us, there remains only a "naked abstract" I, an I infallibly written with a capital letter and italicised, equal to "the insane piano, which imagined that it was the sole existing thing in this world." If the "sensible content" of our sensations is not the external world, then nothing exists save this naked I engaged in empty "philosophical" acrobatics.

— Chapter 1.1, "Sensations and Complexes of Sensations"

Lenin also accused Mach of plagiarizing George Berkeley's views on this basis:

It is a sheer plagiarism on Berkeley. Not a single idea, not a glimmer of thought, except that "we sense only our sensations." From which there is only one possible inference, namely, that the "world consists only of my sensations." .... For if the "assumption" of the existence of the external world is "idle," if the assumption that the needle exists independently of me and that an interaction takes place between my body and the point of the needle is really "idle and superfluous," then primarily the "assumption" of the existence of other people is idle and superfluous. Only I exist, and all other people, as well as the external world, come under the category of idle "nuclei." Holding this point of view one cannot speak of "our" sensations; and when Mach does speak of them, it is only a betrayal of his own amazing half-heartedness. It only proves that his philosophy is a jumble of idle and empty words in which their author himself does not believe.

— Chapter 1.1, "Sensations and Complexes of Sensations"

In accordance with empirio-critical philosophy, Mach opposed Ludwig Boltzmann and others who proposed an atomic theory of physics. Since one cannot observe things as small as atoms directly, and since no atomic model at the time was consistent, the atomic hypothesis seemed unwarranted to Mach, and perhaps not sufficiently "economical". Mach had a direct influence on the Vienna Circle philosophers and logical positivism in general.

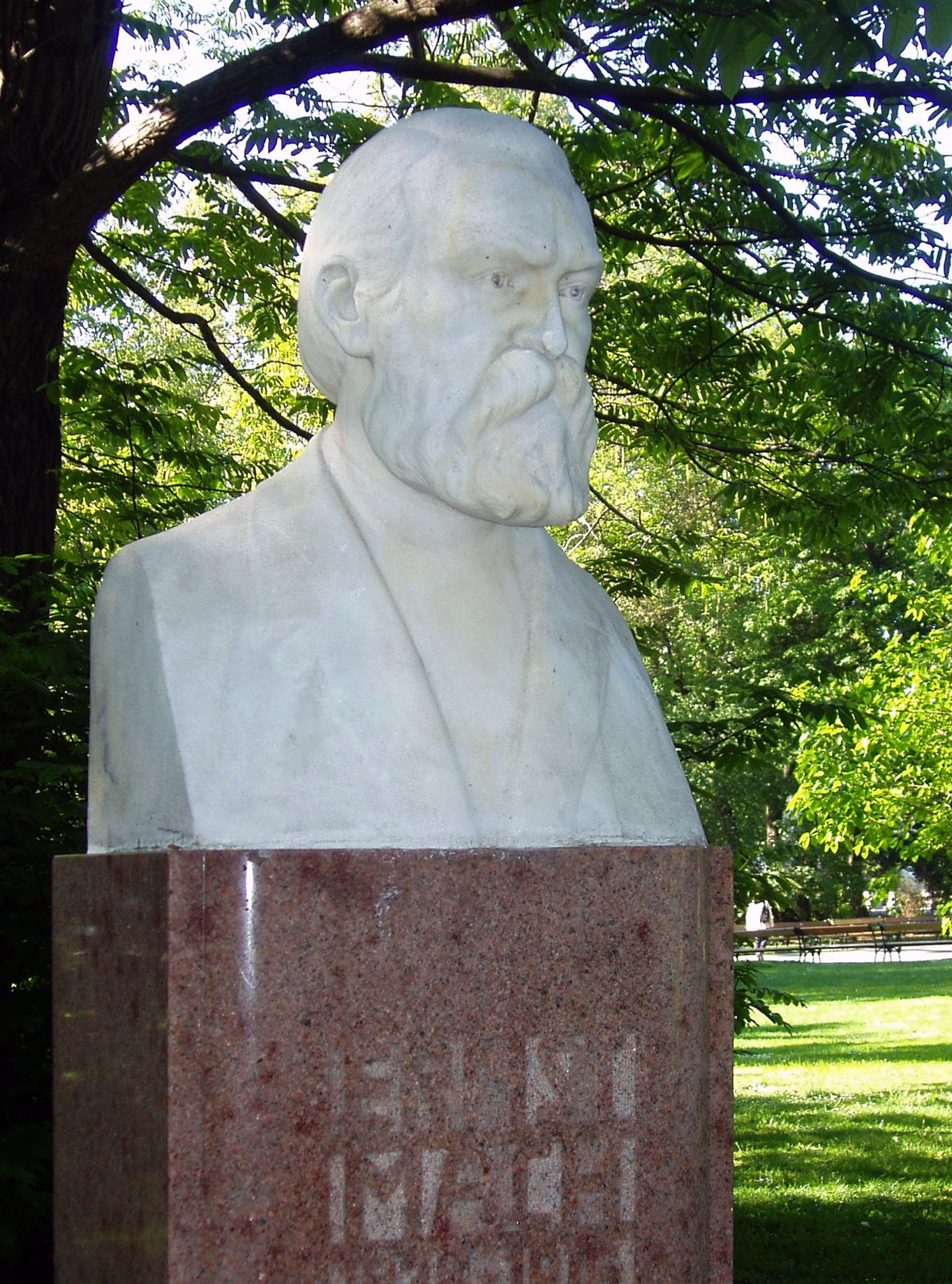
Bust of Mach in the Rathauspark (City Hall Park) in Vienna, Austria

Several principles are attributed to Mach that distill his ideal of physical theorization, called "Machian physics":

1. It should be based entirely on directly observable phenomena (in line with his positivistic leanings) (Note: Barbour 2001, p. 220 states "In the Machian view, the properties of the system are exhausted by the masses of the particles and their separations, but the separations are mutual properties. Apart from the masses, the particles have no attributes that are exclusively their own. They — in the form of a triangle — are a single thing. In the Newtonian view, the particles exist in absolute space and time. These external elements lend the particles attributes — position, momentum, angular momentum — denied in the Machian view. The particles become three things. Absolute space and time are an essential part of atomism".)
2. It should completely eschew absolute space and time in favour of relative motion
3. Any phenomena that seem attributable to absolute space and time (e.g., inertia and centrifugal force) should instead be seen as emerging from the distribution of matter in the universe.

The last is singled out, particularly by Einstein, as "the" Mach's principle. Einstein cited it as one of the three principles underlying general relativity. In 1930, he wrote, "it is justified to consider Mach as the precursor of the general theory of relativity" and "the whole direction of thought of this theory conforms with Mach's". Einstein further reported that he had read David Hume and Mach's work "with eagerness and admiration shortly before finding relativity theory" and that "very possibly, I wouldn't have come to the solution without those philosophical studies". Before his death, Mach apparently rejected Einstein's theory. (Note: The preface of the posthumously published Principles of Physical Optics explicitly rejects Einstein's relativistic views but it has been argued that the text is inauthentic.(Wolters 2012, pp. 39–57)) Einstein knew his theories did not fulfill all Mach's principles, and no subsequent theory has either.

=== Epistemological constructivism ===
According to Alexander Riegler, Mach's work was a precursor to the influential perspective known as constructivism. Constructivism holds that all knowledge is constructed rather than received by the learner. He took an exceptionally non-dualist, phenomenological position. The founder of radical constructivism, Ernst von Glasersfeld, gave a nod to Mach as an ally.

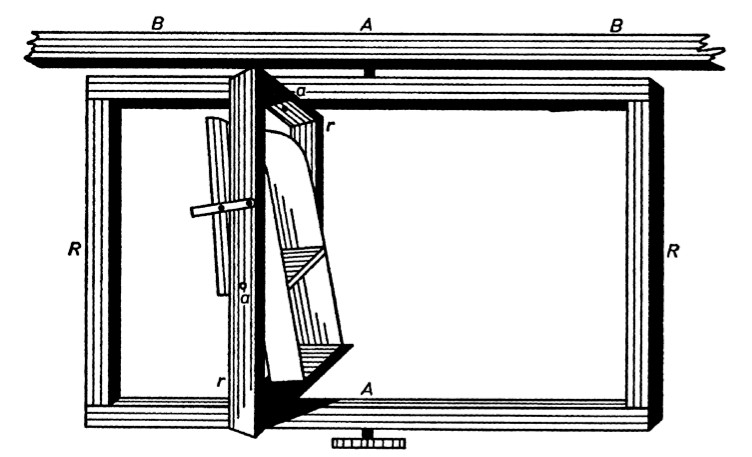
Spinning chair devised by Mach to investigate the experience of motion

On the other hand, there is also a reasonable case for viewing Mach simply as an empiricist and a precursor of the logical empiricists and the Vienna Circle. On this view, the purpose of science is to detail functional relationships between observations: "The goal which it (physical science) has set itself is the simplest and most economical abstract expression of facts."

=== Influence ===
Friedrich Hayek wrote that, when he attended the University of Vienna from 1918 to 1921, "as far as philosophical discussion went it essentially revolved around Mach's ideas". Mach's work has also been cited as an influence on the Vienna Circle, being described as a "major precursor of logical positivism". Members of the Circle organized the "Ernst Mach Society" as a vehicle for discussion of their ideas.

Mach's work was a "forerunner" of Gestalt psychology.

== Physiology ==
In 1873, independently of each other, Mach and the physiologist and physician Josef Breuer discovered how the sense of balance (i.e., the perception of the head's imbalance) functions, tracing its management by information the brain receives from the movement of a fluid in the semicircular canals of the inner ear. That the sense of balance depends on the three semicircular canals was discovered in 1870 by the physiologist Friedrich Goltz, but Goltz did not discover how the balance-sensing apparatus functions. Mach devised a swivel chair to test his theories, and Floyd Ratliff has suggested that this experiment may have paved the way to Mach's critique of a physical conception of absolute space and motion.

== Psychology ==
Exaggerated contrast between edges of the slightly differing shades of gray, appears as soon as they make contact

In the area of sensory perception, psychologists remember Mach for the optical illusion called Mach bands. The effect exaggerates the contrast between edges of the slightly differing shades of gray as soon as they make contact, by triggering edge-detection in the human visual system.

More clearly than anyone before or since, Mach made the distinction between what he called physiological (specifically visual) and geometrical spaces.

Mach's views on mediating structures inspired B. F. Skinner's strongly inductive position, which paralleled Mach's in the field of psychology.

== Eponyms ==
In homage his name was given to:

- 3949 Mach, an asteroid
- Mach, a lunar crater
- Mach bands, an optical illusion
- Mach diamonds, seen in supersonic exhausts
- Mach Five, the car used by Speed Racer
- Mach number, the unit for speed relative to the speed of sound

== Bibliography ==
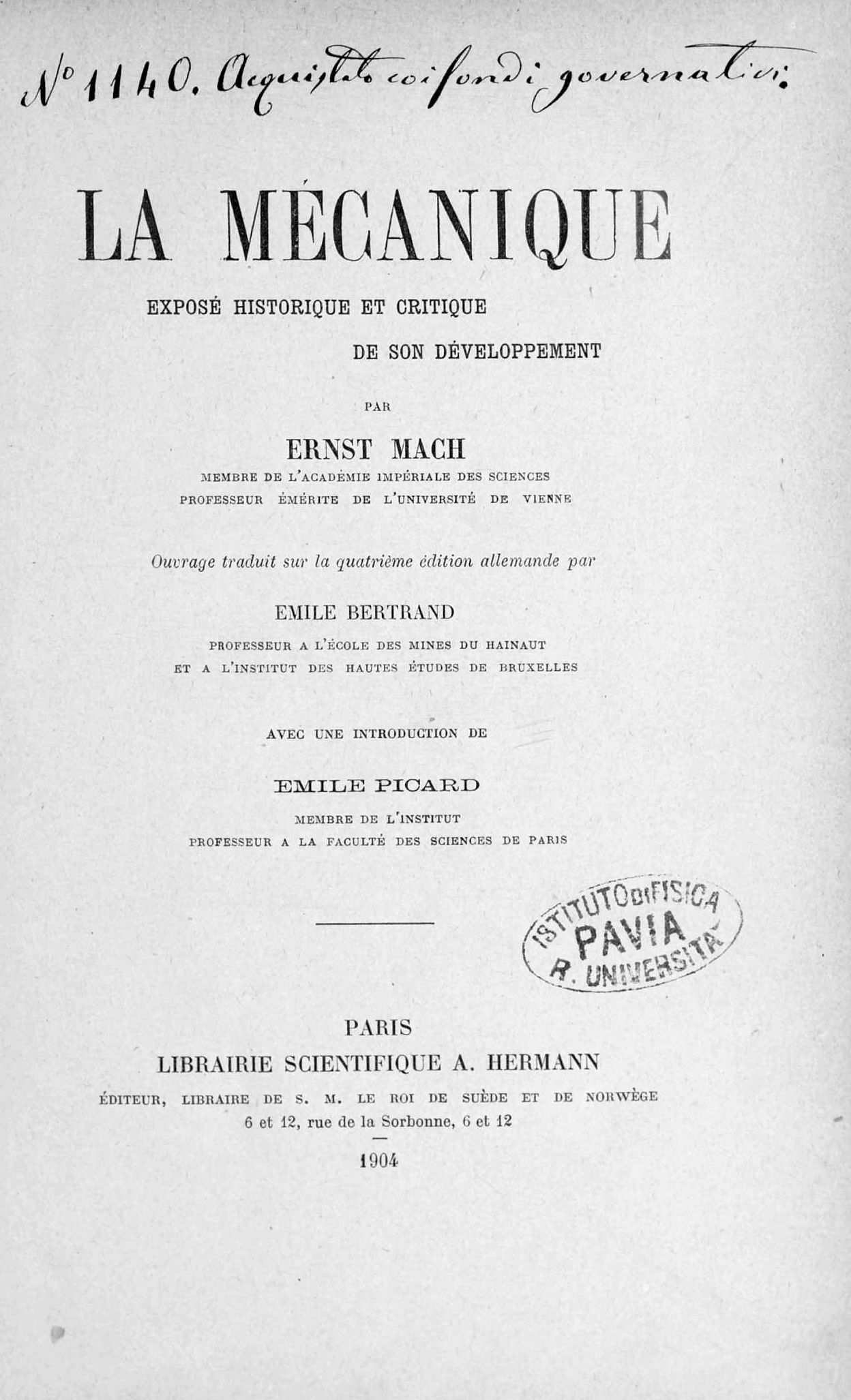
La mécanique, 1904

- Mach, Ernst (1873). Optisch-akustische Versuche (in German). Praha: Calve.
- Mach, Ernst (1886). Beiträge zur Analyse der Empfindungen (in German). Jena: Gustav Fischer. (Later editions were published under the title Analyse der Empfindungen und das Verhältnis des Physischen zum Psychischen)
- Mach, E.; Salcher, P. (1887). "Photographische Fixirung der durch Projectile in der Luft eingeleiteten Vorgänge". Sitzungsber. Kaiserl. Akad. Wiss., Wien, Math.-Naturwiss. Cl. (in German). 95 (Abt. II): 764–780. Bibcode:1887AnP...268..277M. doi:10.1002/andp.18872681008.
- Mach, Ernst (1900). Principien der Wärmelehre (in German). Leipzig: Johann Ambrosius Barth.
- Mach, Ernst (1901). Die Mechanik in ihrer Entwicklung historisch-kritisch dargestellt (in German). Leipzig: F. A. Brockhaus.
- Mach, Ernst (1905). Erkenntnis und Irrtum: Skizzen zur Psychologie der Forschung (in German). Leipzig: Johann Ambrosius Barth.

Mach's principal works in English:

- The Science of Mechanics. Translated by McCormack, Thomas J. (4 ed.). Chicago: The Open Court Publishing Co. 1919 [1883]. From Die Mechanik in ihrer Entwicklung historisch-kritisch dargestellt (above)
- Williams, C. W., ed. (1897). "The Analysis of Sensations". Contributions to the Analysis of Sensation (1st ed.). Chicago: Open Court Publishing Company.
- Popular Scientific Lectures (1895); Revised & enlarged 3rd edition (1898)
- "Space and Geometry from the Point of View of Physical Inquiry". Monist. 14 (1): 1–32. 1903. doi:10.5840/monist190314139. ISSN 0026-9662. with S.J.B. Sugden
- History and Root of the Principle of the Conservation of Energy (1911)
- The Principles of Physical Optics (1926)
- Knowledge and Error (1976)
- Principles of the Theory of Heat (1986)
- Fundamentals of the Theory of Movement Perception (2001)

== See also ==
- Energeticism
- Mach (kernel)
- Mach bands
- Mach disk
- Mach reflection
- Mach's principle
- Mach–Zehnder interferometer
- Stereokinetic stimulus
- Visual space
