= Stuart Appelle =

American psychologist

- Born: April 3, 1946
- Died: June 27, 2011 (aged 65); Brighton, Monroe County, New York
- Citizenship: American
- Education: Pennsylvania State University; George Washington University
- Scientific career
- Fields: Psychology, Ufology
- Workplaces: SUNY Brockport

Stuart Appelle (April 3, 1946 – June 27, 2011) was a psychologist and writer, with an interest in topics dealing with anomalous perception, including hypnotic experience, and reports of unidentified flying objects and alien abduction.

== Biography ==
Born in 1946, Stuart Appelle began his graduate work in experimental psychology at the Pennsylvania State University. He received his Ph.D. from George Washington University in 1972. In addition to teaching at State University of New York Brockport (SUNY Brockport), he has held teaching or research positions at George Washington University, Mount Vernon College, and the University of Rochester School of Medicine and Dentistry (Department of Pediatrics).

Appelle had worked as Dean of the School of Letters and Sciences at SUNY Brockport. at SUNY Brockport. A former chairman of the Department of Psychology, he had also served as interim Dean of the School of Letters and Sciences, Associate Dean of the School of Letters and Sciences, and as the director of Brockport's graduate program in Liberal Studies. He used to be a professor of psychology at Brockport.

Professor Appelle's research focused on visual and tactual perception, and in particular on object orientation. He introduced the concept of the oblique effect, a construct that is routinely presented in perception textbooks, and broadly cited in the research literature. He is author of more than 40 articles and book chapters, more than 80 entries in the reference text Engineering Data Compendium: Human Perception and Performance, and has presented papers at more than 20 professional meetings.

In addition to these administrative activities, Appelle was an active scholar whose research focuses on perception, and the nature of conscious experience. His work in these areas has been widely published, spanning theoretical problems in the senses, applied work related to blind and developmentally delayed populations, and topics of popular interest such as hypnosis and anomalous experience (e.g. accounts of unidentified flying objects and alien abductions). Dean Appelle was a member of nine professional organizations including the American Psychological Association, the American Psychological Society, Psychonomic Society, and the Society for Clinical and Experimental Hypnosis.

On June 27, 2011, Appelle died at the age of 65
