= Oblique effect =

Oblique effect is the name given to the relative deficiency in perceptual performance for oblique contours as compared to the performance for horizontal or vertical contours.

== Background ==
The earliest known observation of this effect came about in 1861 when Ernst Mach completed an experiment in which he set a line to make it appear parallel to an adjoining one, and found observers' errors to be least for horizontal and vertical orientations and largest for an inclination of 45 degrees. The effect can be demonstrated for many visual tasks and was named oblique effect in the widely cited article by Stuart Appelle.

== The phenomenon ==
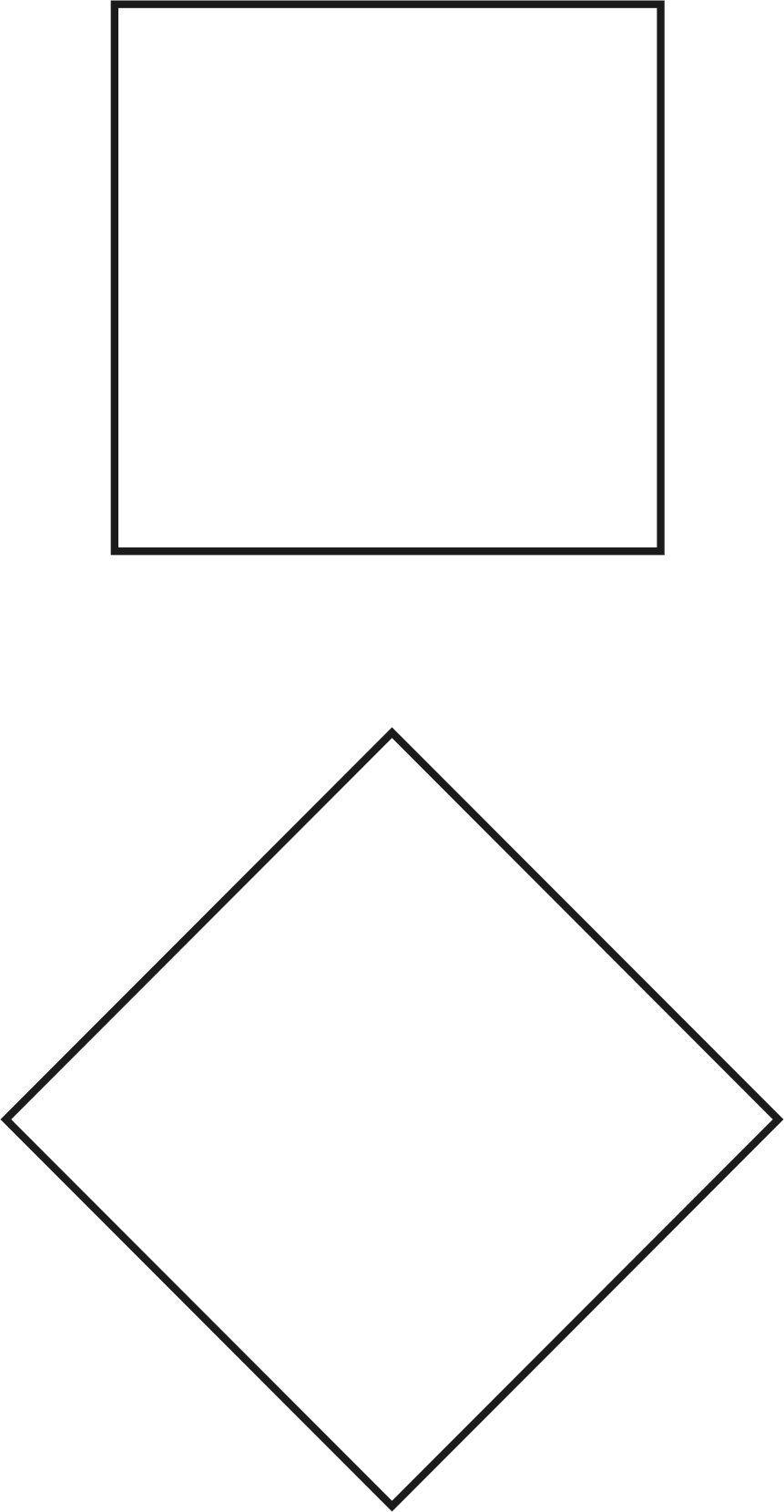
Appearance of figure changes on 45-degree rotation

The effect is exhibited predominantly in tasks involving discrimination of the angle of tilt of patterns or contours. People are very good at detecting whether a picture is hung vertical, but are two- to fourfold worse for a 45-degree oblique contour, even when a comparison is available. However there is no oblique deficit in some other tasks, such as judgment of lengths. Similarly, while it is harder to judge the direction of motion when it is oblique, this is not the case for speed.

The figure on the right shows the performance when an observer makes judgments about the length (top) and the orientation (bottom) of a line, in eight orientations around the clock.

Even the immediate appearance of the form of a figure, often called gestalt, changes on a 45-degree rotation—the geometrical congruity of the square and the diamond does not extend to their perception as figures (see left) as was emphasized by Ernst Mach.

== Origin of the oblique effect ==
As with geometrical-optical illusions the oblique effect can be examined at two levels. The physiological one looks at the neural apparatus. Much pertinent information has been gathered here, yet the phenomenon was discovered in, and has ultimate relevance to, the whole organism's performance. Hence it is not contradictory to follow two separate tracks of explanation.

=== Physiological ===
Neural processing of contours was highlighted by the classical research by Hubel and Wiesel which revealed neural units right at the entrance of visual signals into the brain that respond preferentially to lines and edges. When the distribution of preferred orientation of these units was examined, there were fewer in the oblique meridians than in the vertical and horizontal.

Orientation differences also occur in testing the visual brain with probes for cell connectivity and with imaging techniques.

However, in contrast to the strong behavioral effect, evidence for orientation selectivity bias in primary visual cortex is weak and controversial. Actually, many human fMRI studies have failed to see this biased activity in primary visual cortex. Rather, more recent studies have suggested that, oblique effect may be due to selectivity for cardinal (i.e. horizontal and vertical) orientations in higher level visual areas and more specifically in parahippocampal place area (PPA), an area devoted to scene perception. This finding is supported by the fact that, among all visual object categories, perception of scenes (both natural and man-made environments) receives more processing benefit from the oblique effect and higher visual acuity for horizontal and vertical contours, due to their unique structure.

=== Empirical ===
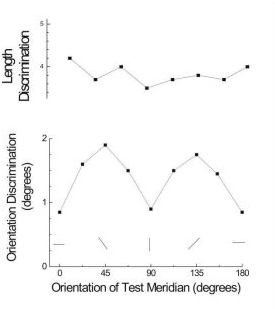
Discrimination of length (top) and orientation (bottom) for a line at various orientations around the clock

Nevertheless, there is an oblique effect for target configurations that do not directly address these "oriented" neural elements early in the visual path into the brain. Regardless of where in the brain of the human or animals an oblique effect is found, one would still like to know whether it is an inevitable consequence of the way neural signals are processed, or whether it is a minor error that nature hadn't been bothered to correct, or whether it fulfills a function in making us better in handling our visual environment. Proposing a "purpose" of the oblique effect, and developing scientific support for it is still a work in progress. A popular concept is that we live in a carpentered environment. Attempts at empirical explanations of perceptual visual phenomena have led to the examination of the orientation distribution of contours in the everyday visual world.

Competing explanations have to contend with questions, not yet finalized, of innateness of horizontal/vertical superiority, of body symmetry in anatomical organization, of methodology of measurement, and particularly, of issues associated with perceptual development in infants and children, and across cultures.

== See also ==
- Judgment of Line Orientation

== Notes ==
Meridian: In vision, a plane containing the anterior-posterior axis of the eye. According to standards in the eye professions, the left side of the horizontal meridian, as seen by the subject, has 0-deg orientation, and orientations increase in a clockwise direction, again as seen by subject.

Cardinal directions are horizontal and vertical.

The horizontal effect is an extension of the oblique effect in which... When presented [with] a natural or other broad-band scene, people see oblique content the best and they actually see horizontal content the worst, with vertical usually falling in between.

Vertical-horizontal illusion, the overestimation of vertical distances in vision, is not generally encompassed by the oblique effect, which mostly lumps the vertical and horizontal together in making comparisons with the obliques.
