= Theodor Gomperz =

Austrian philosopher (1832–1912)

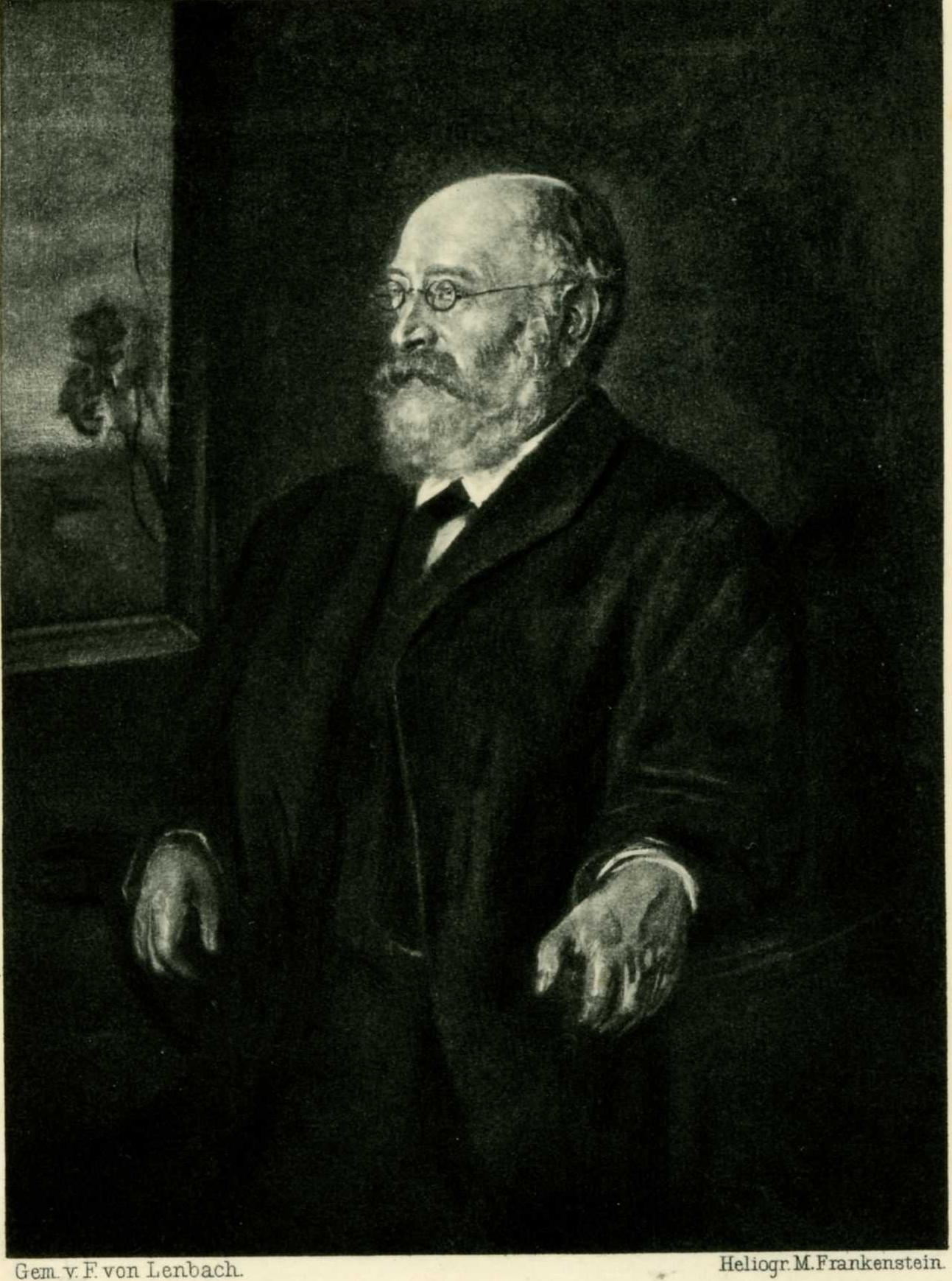
Theodor Gomperz

Theodor Gomperz (German: [ˈɡɔmpɐts]; March 29, 1832 – August 29, 1912) was an Austrian philosopher and classical scholar, born in Brno (Brünn).

== Biography ==
An assimilated Jew, Gomperz studied at the Philosophical Institute (a higher preparatory institution) in Brünn from 1847 to 1849, before continuing his studies at the University of Vienna under Hermann Bonitz. After the graduating from the University of Vienna in 1867 he became a Privatdozent, and subsequently a professor of classical philology (1873). In 1882 he was elected a full member of the Vienna Academy of Sciences. He received the degree of Doctor of Philosophy honoris causa from the University of Königsberg, and Doctor of Literature from the universities of Dublin and Cambridge, and became correspondent for several learned societies.

Gomperz resigned his professorship at Vienna in order to devote all his energy to his magnum opus Griechische Denker ("Greek Thinkers"), which first appeared in 1893.

He died in Baden bei Wien.

Along with his son, Heinrich Gomperz, he collected a large library of rare books and first editions, which the University of South Carolina managed to save from Nazi control shortly before World War Two.

== Works ==
- Demosthenes der Staatsmann (1864)
- Philodemi de ira liber (1864)
- Traumdeutung und Zauberei (1866)
- Herculanische Studien (1865–1866)
- Beiträge zur Kritik und Erklärung griech. Schriftsteller (7 vols, 1875–1900)
- Neue Bruchstücke Epikurs (1876)
- Die Bruchstücke der griech. Tragiker und Cobets neueste kritische Manier (1878)
- Herodoteische Studien (1883)
- Ein bisher unbekannies griech. Schriftsystem (1884)
- Zu Philodems Büchern von der Musik (1885)
- Über den Abschluß des herodoteischen Geschichtswerkes (1886)
- Platonische Aufsätze (3 vols, 1887–1905)
- Zu Heraklits Lehre und den Überresten seines Werkes (1887)
- Zu Aristoteles' Poëtik (2 parts, 1888–1896)
- Über die Charaktere Theophrasts (1888)
- Nachlese zu den Bruchstücken der griechischen Tragiker (1888)
- Die Apologie der Heilkunst (1890)
- Philodem und die ästhetischen Schriften der herculanischen Bibliothek (1891)
- Die Schrift vom Staatswesen der Athener (1891)
- Die jüngst entdeckten Überreste einer den platonischen Phädon enthaltenden Papyrusrolle (1892)
- Aus der Hekale des Kallimachos (1893)
- Griechische Denker. Eine Geschichte der antiken Philosophie (Three volumes, 1896, 1902, 1909)
- Essays und Erinnerungen (1905)
- Die Apologie der Heilkunst. Eine griechische Sophistenrede des 5. vorchristlichen Jahrhunderts (1910)
- Hellenika. Eine Auswahl philologischer und philosophiegeschichtlicher kleiner Schriften (1912)

Gomperz supervised a translation of John Stuart Mill's complete works (12 vols., Leipzig, 1869–1880), and wrote a life (Vienna, 1889) of Mill. His Griechische Denker: Geschichte der antiken Philosophie (vols. i. and ii., Leipzig, 1893 and 1902) was translated into English by L. Magnus (vol. i., 1901). Volumes ii & iii were translated into English by G. G. Berry.

Lewis Campbell gives an overview of Gomperz as writer and scholar in The Hibbert Journal, 5:2, January 1907, pp. 439–448.
