= Days Without Dawn =

Studio album by Jason Lo
- Released: 18 November 1999
- Recorded: 1999
- Studios: Synchrosound Studios (Petaling Jaya, Selangor)
- Genres: Alternative pop, progressive rock
- Length: 44:17
- Label: Fat Boys Records
- Producers: Jason Lo; Greg Henderson; Nick Blasband (exec.)

Jason Lo chronology
Days Without Dawn (1999)	Firefighter (2002)

Singles from Days Without Dawn
- 1. "Evening News" Released: 1999; 2. "So Julie" Released: 1999

Days Without Dawn is the debut studio album by Malaysian singer-songwriter, Jason Lo (credited as LO), released on 18 November 1999 by his own label, Fat Boys Records.

== Production ==
Days Without Dawn is the first official album release by Jason Lo, after previously having recorded a 10-track demo in England with his band Sunday Man and another 10-track album with his renamed band Drop Circle. Upon his return to Malaysia in February 1999, Lo began recording material for what was to be his debut solo album, under his newly-established Fat Boys Records, where he self-financed the album and serves as the producer.

According to Lo, Days Without Dawn was a depiction of "a journey with rocky patches", dealing with themes such as life turmoil and politics. "Evening News", for example, was about reflections instead of "anything that is right or wrong". Another, "Still Running", the first song he written for the album, was inspired by a BBC television show about homeless. Songwriting was handled by Lo, who composed and wrote all 11 songs and produced seven songs while the remaining four was handled by Greg Henderson. He described the whole songwriting process "is like painting, starting with a blank page and putting it up in a gallery". Lo also took inspiration from and blended elements of Radiohead, Green Day and Gin Blossoms to arrange the album.

In the album, he plays lead guitar and rhythm guitars on all tracks though he also plays bass and keyboards. Lo was joined by other musicians who plays respective musical instruments, including Henderson on guitars, Daryn Fletcher on rhythm guitars, Leon Le Mercier on bass and Luke Mason and Paul Morrisson on drums. The album was recorded and mixed at the Synchrosound Studios in Petaling Jaya, Selangor and mastered by Ted Jensen at the Sterling Sound in New York City, United States.

== Release and reception ==
The album was released on 18 November 1999, with "Evening News" and "So Julie" was released as the lead singles and received music videos. It was well-received and selling over 10,000 copies. Zainal Alam Kadir, writing for the New Straits Times, described the album "could be easily part of your collection with many adult contemporary tracks that offers thought-provoking". It also earned Jason Lo three nominations at the seventh edition of Anugerah Industri Muzik.

== Track listing ==
All tracks are written by Jason Lo.

No.	Title	Length
1.	"Raining Tuesday"	3:59
2.	"Evening News"	4:24
3.	"Crash"	3:52
4.	"Magical Land"	5:16
5.	"This Is Where I Live"	2:54
6.	"I'm Not There"	4:16
7.	"Days Without Dawn"	4:27
8.	"Min"	5:25
9.	"Misadventure"	4:19
10.	"So Julie"	4:55
11.	"Still Running"	3:29
Total length:		44:17

== Credits and personnel ==
The credits are adapted from the album's booklet liner notes.

Performers and musicians

- Jason Lo - vocals (all tracks), lead guitars (all tracks), rhythm guitars (all tracks), bass (tracks 8–10), keyboards (track 8)
- Jessica - additional vocals (track 2)
- Sara-Jane Lo - backing vocals (track 4)
- Greg Henderson - backing vocals (tracks 6 and 11), lead guitars (tracks 3, 4, 6 and 11), rhythm guitars (tracks 3, 4 and 11), piano (track 6)
- Daryn Fletcher - lead guitars (track 4), rhythm guitars (track 6)
- Jamie Wilson - lead guitars (track 5)
- Pacai - bass (tracks 1 and 7)
- Leon Le Mercier - bass (tracks 3, 4, 6 and 11)
- Jojet Mohamed - drums (tracks 1, 5 and 9)
- Luke Mason - drums (tracks 2, 7 and 10)
- Paul Morrison - drums (tracks 3 and 4)
- Jenny Chin - strings (track 10)
- Chessman - cello (track 10)
- Bo Derek - viola (track 10)
- Ifaginia London - violin (track 10)
- Steve Bryant - violin (track 10)

Technical and production

- Jason Lo - producer
- Greg Henderson - producer, mixer
- Nick Blasband - executive producer, mixer
- Peter Chong - mixer
- Ahmad Zairi Ariffin - mixer
- Ali Nassiri - artwork
- Ted Jensen - mastering
- Synchrosound Studios - recording and mixing studio
- Sterling Sound - mastering studio

== Awards ==
Award	Year	Recipient(s) and nominee(s)	Category	Result	Ref(s)
Anugerah Industri Muzik	2000	Days Without Dawn	Best Local English Album	Nominated	
Anugerah Industri Muzik	2000	Days Without Dawn	Best Engineered Album	Nominated	
Anugerah Industri Muzik	2000	"So Julie"	Best Music Video	Nominated	

== Release history ==
Release history
Region	Date	Format(s)	Label	Ref.
Malaysia	November 18, 1999	CD; music download; streaming	Fat Boys Records, Universal Music Malaysia	
