= The Fall (Jason Lo album) =

Studio album by Jason Lo
- Released: 4 October 2005
- Recorded: 2005
- Studio: Fat Boys Drive (Kuala Lumpur)
- Genres: Alternative pop, progressive rock
- Length: 42:50
- Label: Fat Boys Records
- Producer: Jason Lo

Jason Lo chronology
Firefighter (2002)	The Fall (2005)

Singles from The Fall
- 1. "Sleepy Head" Released: 2005; 2. "Operator, the Line is Dead" Released: 2005

The Fall is the third studio album by Malaysian singer-songwriter, Jason Lo (credited as LO), released on 4 October 2005 by Fat Boys Records.

== Production ==
More than three years after the release of his second album, Firefighter (2002), Jason Lo announced on that he will be releasing his third album as early as October 2005, and titled as The Fall. The album was recorded with Lo on vocals, lead/rhythm guitars and keyboards, Pacai on bass and Effendy "Sotong" Mokhtar on drums. He also joined by other musicians like Jamie Wilson on lead guitar and Chan Kum Loong on erhu.

Unlike his first two albums, which was recorded at Synchrosound Studios in Petaling Jaya, Selangor, The Fall was recorded primarily at Lo's own studio, Fat Boys Drive in Kuala Lumpur. Songwriting was handled by Lo, who also served as the producer for most of the tracks except "Redondo" which was produced by Greg Henderson and Wilson. The mixing was handled by Henderson and Lo. The mastering process was done by Leon Zervos at Sterling Sound in New York City, United States.

== Artwork ==
The cover art photography was taken by Zain "Ajin" Jais, former member of Malaysian rock band Blackrose. It is a close-up image of a solar LED traffic blinker. In the booklet there also images of Lo performing live on stage.

== Release and reception ==
The Fall was released on 4 October 2005 to popular success. "Operator, the Line is Dead" and "Sleepy Head" was released as main singles and made into music videos. The album was well-received, selling 5,000 copies despite rampant digital downloads. It also earned Lo the Best Music Video category for "Sleepy Head" and two nominations for the album including Best Local English Album category at the 13th edition of Anugerah Industri Muzik.

== Track listing ==
All tracks are written by Jason Lo.

No.	Title	Length
1.	"Feel No One"	3:52
2.	"Operator, the Line is Dead"	3:36
3.	"Sleepy Head"	3:47
4.	"Impress Them"	3:22
5.	"Do You have a Light?"	3:55
6.	"Redondo"	2:51
7.	"In My Way"	4:25
8.	"The Inside"	4:04
9.	"Paid"	3:35
10.	"The Fall"	5:49
Total length:		42:50

== Credits and personnel ==
The credits are adapted from the album's booklet liner notes.

Performers and musicians

- Jason Lo - vocals, lead guitars, rhythm guitars, keyboards
- Fauzi "Aji" Samin - guitars
- Jamie Wilson - guitars
- Pacai - bass
- Effendy "Sotong" Mokhtar - drums
- Chan Kum Loong - erhu
- Greg Henderson - guitars, keyboards, drums

Technical and production

- Jason Lo - composer, lyricist, producer, mixer (tracks 7 and 9)
- Greg Henderson - producer (track 6), mixer
- Leon Zervos - mastering
- Jamie Wilson - producer (track 6)
- Zain "Ajin" Jais - photography, cover art design
- Fat Boys Drive - recording and mixing studio
- Sterling Sound - mastering studio

== Awards ==
Award	Year	Recipient(s) and nominee(s)	Category	Result	Ref(s)
Anugerah Industri Muzik	2006	The Fall	Best Local English Album	Nominated	
Anugerah Industri Muzik	2006	The Fall	Best Engineered Album	Nominated	
Anugerah Industri Muzik	2006	"Sleepy Head"	Best Music Video	Won	

== Release history ==
Release history
Region	Date	Format(s)	Label	Ref.
Malaysia	October 4, 2005	CD; music download; streaming	Fat Boys Records, Universal Music Malaysia	
