= Let's Do It All Again =

Single by Disagree

from the album Black & White in Colour
- Released: 15 May 2026
- Recorded: 2025
- Studio: Studios 301 (Sydney, Australia)
- Genre: Alternative rock
- Length: 3:46
- Label: Virtual Event Platform Asia
- Songwriter: Mohamed Zahid Yon
- Producer: Greg Henderson

Disagree singles chronology
"The Tiniest Moment" (2010)	"Let's Do It All Again" (2026)	"Home" (2026)

Music video
- "Let's Do It All Again" on YouTube

"Let's Do It All Again" is a song by Malaysian rock band, Disagree, which was released on 15 May 2026 by Virtual Event Platform Asia as the first single from their third album, Black & White in Colour. It was written by Mohamed Zahid Yon and produced by Greg Henderson.

== Background and release ==
"Let's Do It All Again" served as Disagree's comeback single after 15 years of their absent from music industry. The song was released on 15 May 2026 to coincide with their comeback and as part of their third studio album, Black & White in Colour. It is also their official single release in 15 years.

== Composition ==
The song's composition, according to the band, is "an indie-pop/alternative rock anthem suited for playlists centered on indie rock revival, nostalgic alternative, feel-good reflection, comeback stories and emotional storytelling". Like most of Disagree's songs, it was composed by its lead vocalist and guitarist, Mohamed Zahid Yon and produced and mixed by Greg Henderson and mastered by Leon Zervos. The track was recorded at Studios 301 in Sydney, Australia.

== Music video ==
The music video for the single was released on the same day on the band's official YouTube channel and features vintage band footage. The video starts with a quote from the band, which reads: "For those who carry the past in their hearts, this moment is for you..." and ends with the song title appears, followed by the band name. Since its release, it garnered more than 27 million views.

== Critical reception ==
Upon its release as a single, Music Addicts described the song as "an emotional anthem". Budiey from Sensasi Selebriti said the song's title "sounds like a simple but hopeful invitation".

== Format and track listing ==
- Digital download
1. "Let's Do It All Again" – 3:46

== Release history ==
Country	Date	Format	Label
Malaysia	15 May 2026	Digital download; streaming	Virtual Event Platform Asia
