= MyTeam =

Malaysian television series

MyTeam is a Malaysian reality TV series which aired on TV3. The idea behind the show was to select a team of soccer players with no professional playing experience known as "MyTeam", have them trained by top coach, and then have them play a match against the Malaysian national football team (which MyTeam lost 2–1). Season 1 of the show aired in 2006. A second season, MyTeam2, aired in 2007. The season 2 team unsuccessfully challenged the Indonesia national team, 2–0). The former Malaysia national team footballer Shebby Singh was the coach of both MyTeam and MyTeam2.

Following the success of season 1, MyTeam was subsequently invited to join the Malaysian Premier League for the 2007 season. After merging with the existing club Perak UPB FC, MyTeam joined the league under the name UPB-MyTeam FC. The club finished runners-up in the Premier League in 2007, and were thus promoted to the Malaysian Super League for the 2008 season.

The series has also spawned an Indonesian version of the show.

== Idea ==
Malaysian politician Khairy Jamaluddin and radio DJ Jason Lo were the creators of the MyTeam concept, and served as the Executive Producers of the show. The idea was to have 22 non-professional players selected from trials held across Malaysia competing against the Malaysian national squad, with the selection and training of the team being track through the show's broadcasts. The show was launched through an event at Kuala Lumpur Planet Hollywood, and was hailed as a football revolution. A massive media campaign was launched to generate interest for trials and the match itself. Former Malaysian national team footballer Shebby Singh was engaged to be the team's coach.

== MyTeam season 1 ==
=== Selection ===
Selections trials were open to non-professional Malaysian footballers. Participants were required to be at least 17 years of age, and had to be able to run 100 metres in less than 12 seconds.

Trials were held in all 13 Malaysian states, and the top three trialists from each state were called to a final round of trials at Bukit Jalil. From a total of 39 players selected from each state, 22 were selected to be squad members of MyTeam.

=== Match ===
The match, held in the National Stadium in Bukit Jalil, kicked off at 8.45 pm on May 28, 2006. Prior to the match, controversy was stirred up when the Secretary-General of the Football Association of Malaysia (FAM) likened MyTeam to a packet of instant noodles.

There was also an element of mystery as there was a fair amount of speculation over the "national team" that would show up to play MyTeam. Some speculated that the FAM would send its under-20 side to play MyTeam. Others thought the senior Malaysian side would show up. In the end, the "Malaysia" that played MyTeam was a mixture of both the senior and under-20 sides managed by K. Rajagopal (coach for the under-20 side).

MyTeam stunned Malaysia by taking the lead first, before eventually succumbing to a 2–1 defeat. In two separate incidents that occurred between goals from both teams, MyTeam's captain and Malaysian striker Zaquan Adha were sent off.

=== Aftermath ===
The match did generate a considerable amount of interest, though many scorned the supposed "revolution of Malaysian football".

On a positive note, the senior team won the match; but on the negative side, Malaysia managed to play badly enough against a team of amateurs to embarrass themselves.

MyTeam joined the Malaysian Premier League for the 2007 season after taking over an existing team called Perak UPB FC, competing under the name UPB-MyTeam FC. Khairy Jamaluddin and Jason Lo, who created the MyTeam show, became the President and Deputy President of UPB-MyTeam FC. The team performed well in the league, finishing runners-up and earning promotion to the Malaysian Super League for the 2008 season.

== MyTeam2 ==
On June 6, 2007 MyTeam2 was announced by Khairy Jamaluddin. The team selected was again coached by Shebby Singh, assisted by the UPB-MyTeam FC coach Bojan Hodak.

MyTeam2 unsuccessfully challenged the Indonesia national football team on October 21, 2–0.

== See also ==
- UPB-MyTeam FC
