= Stereokinetic stimulus =

Visual illusion effect

Stereokinetic stimulus, stereokinetic depth, stereokinetic illusion is an illusion of depth induced by moving two-dimensional stimuli. A stereokinetic stimulus generates the perception of 3D based on 2D rotational motion. A stereokinetic effect is created when flat displays are rotated in the frontal plane and are perceived as having three-dimensional structure.

== History ==
Ernst Mach first reported a depth effect produced by motion in the frontoparallel plane in 1886. Marcel Duchamp first experimented with stereokinetic depth in 1935.
