= At the End of the Day (Disagree album) =

Studio album by Disagree
- Released: February 10, 2004
- Recorded: 2003
- Studios: Synchrosound Studios (Petaling Jaya, Selangor)
- Genre: Alternative rock
- Length: 63:55
- Label: Fat Boys Records
- Producers: Jason Lo, Disagree

Disagree chronology
| Homemade Jam (2001) | At the End of the Day (2004) | To Prevent the Earth from Moving with You (2009) |

Singles from At the End of the Day
- 1. "Crumbs" Released: 2003; 2. "Suicide Note" Released: 2004; 3. "Scarecrow Adams" Released: 2004; 4. "The Enemy" Released: 2005; 5. "Pooch" Released: 2005

At the End of the Day is the debut studio album by Malaysian rock band Disagree, released on February 10, 2004 by Fat Boys Records. Five singles were released from the album.

== Production ==
Disagree had formed in 1995 and released first demo in 1996 titled Never Cry Wolf and a debut EP in 2001 titled Homemade Jam. During the time of the third edition of Rock the World concert, Jason Lo-owned Fat Boys Records, who signed grunge band Naked Breed, showing its interest to Disagree. After a much discussion, the band took 10 months in 2003 to record what was become their debut album, entitled At the End of the Day. Out of the 11 songs in the album, four of them were previously included in their debut EP, Homemade Jam. The album was recorded at Synchrosound Studios in Petaling Jaya, Selangor with the mastering process was done in California, United States. The album was co-produced by Lo and the band.

== Release and reception ==
The album was released on February 10, 2004 to popular success. "Crumbs", "Suicide Note", "Scarecrow Adams", "The Enemy" and "Pooch" were released as singles and made into music videos. The music video for "The Enemy" features band members in a 3D animation and used as a soundtrack for Pasar Malam Superheroes, an online video game made by Terra ICT.

Upon release, At the End of the Day received generally positive reviews from music critics. Suzan Ahmad, writing for Berita Minggu, noted that Zahid's vocals is "somewhat similar to that of Pearl Jam's Eddie Vedder". A reviewer from Harian Metro also praised the album and shared the same sentiment with Suzan.

The album also earned Disagree a Best New Local English Artiste category and a nomination for the Best Local English Album category at the 12th edition of Anugerah Industri Muzik. "Crumbs" was later selected as one of the theme songs of 2005 film, Gol & Gincu.

== Track listing ==
| No. | Title | Length |
|---|---|---|
| 1. | "Scarecrow Adams" | 6:15 |
| 2. | "Suicide Note" | 5:41 |
| 3. | "Crumbs" | 4:29 |
| 4. | "Slip Away" | 4:58 |
| 5. | "Pooch" | 3:40 |
| 6. | "Ghosting" | 4:26 |
| 7. | "The Enemy" | 5:35 |
| 8. | "Angel's Orchestra" | 7:43 |
| 9. | "Stay" | 5:50 |
| 10. | "Please" | 6:37 |
| 11. | "GC" | 8:19 |
| Total length: | | 63:55 |

== Personnel ==
- Zahid – vocals, lead guitar
- Hamka – drums
- Aziz – bass
- Ashroff – rhythm guitar
- Jason Lo – producer

== Awards ==
| Award | Year | Recipient(s) and nominee(s) | Category | Result | Ref(s) |
|---|---|---|---|---|---|
| Anugerah Industri Muzik | 2005 | At the End of the Day | Best Local English Album | Nominated | |

== Release history ==
Release history
| Region | Date | Format(s) | Label | Ref. |
|---|---|---|---|---|
| Malaysia | February 10, 2004 | CD; cassette; music download; streaming | Fat Boys Records | |
