= Heinrich Gomperz =

Austrian philosopher (1873–1942)

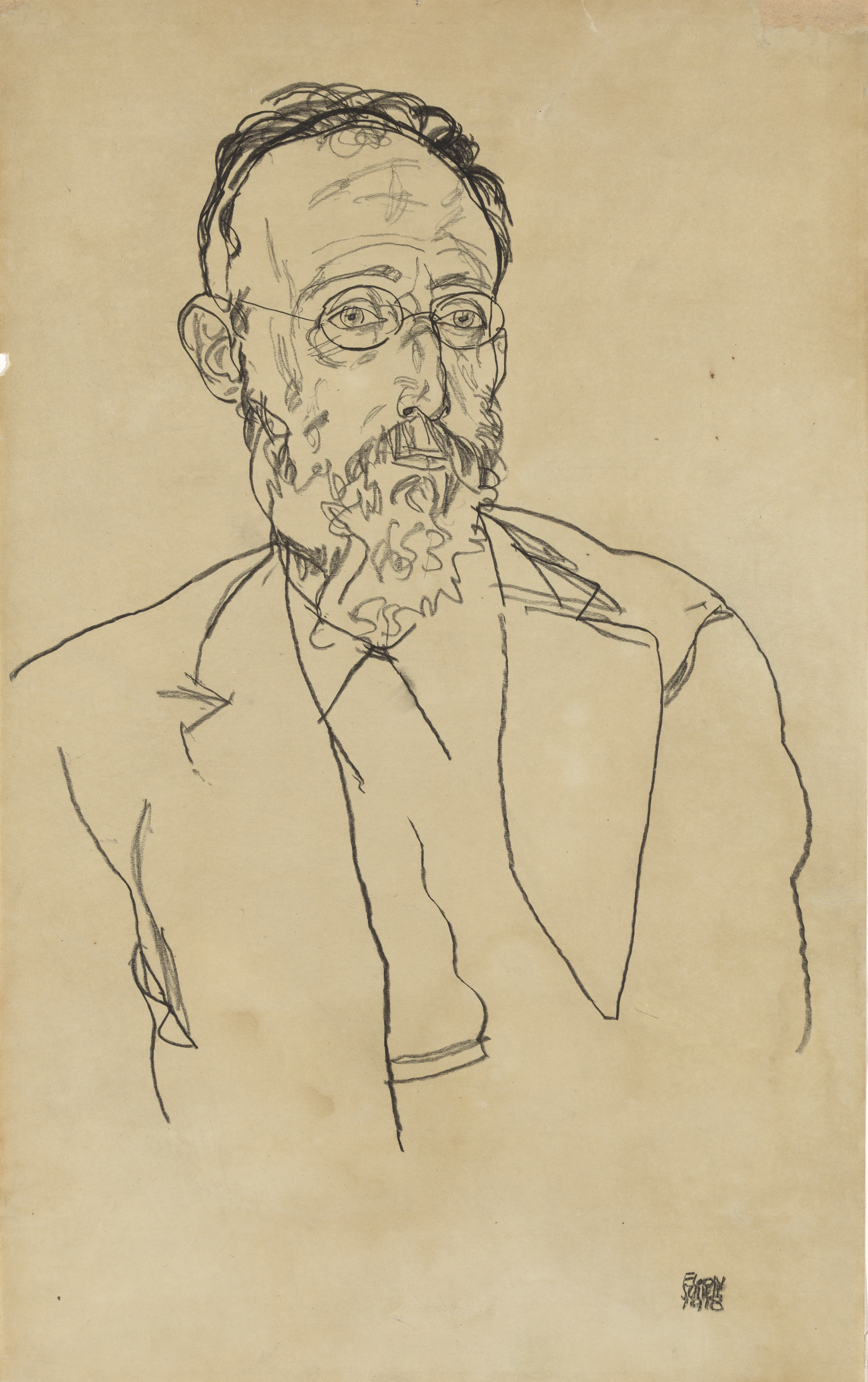
1918 portrait of Gomperz by Egon Schiele

Heinrich Gomperz (German: [ˈɡɔmpɐts]; January 18, 1873, Vienna, Austria-Hungary – December 27, 1942, Los Angeles, California) was an Austrian philosopher.

== Life ==
A son of Theodor Gomperz, he studied law at the University of Vienna from 1891. In the meantime, he studied church history with Adolf Harnack at the University of Berlin. He then returned to Vienna to study classical philology and philosophy. He obtained his doctorate in 1896 under Ernst Mach with the topic Zur Psychologie der logischen Grundtatsachen. He completed his habilitation in Bern in 1900 on The World as an Ordered Event.

From 1905, he worked at Vienna as a private lecturer until he was appointed associate professor in 1920 and full professor of philosophy from 1924 to 1934, specializing in the history of ancient philosophy. During this time, he was associated with the Vienna Circle. Gomperz is considered a late representative of empirio-criticism.

He was forced into retirement in 1934 under the Austrofascist regime; he was persecuted due to his Jewish heritage. In 1935, he emigrated to the U.S. with the help of F. C. S. Schiller, where he held a visiting professorship at the University of Southern California in Los Angeles until his death.

He was married to the interior designer Adele "Ada" Stepnitz, who was born December 11, 1884 in Vienna and died between June 12 and 15, 1954 in the Pacific off Los Angeles.

He was a patient of Sigmund Freud, who had translated several essays by John Stuart Mill for Gomperz' father.

== Works ==
- Kritik des Hedonismus. J.G. Cotta'schen Buchhandlung Nachfolger. 1898.
- Das Problem der Willensfreiheit. E. Diederichs. 1907.
- Weltanschauungslehre. E. Diederichs. 1905.
- Philosophie des Krieges in Umrissen. F. A. Perthes. 1915.
- Psychologische Beobachtungen an griechischen Philosophen. Internationaler psychoanalytischen Verlag. 1924.
- Die indische theosophie vom geschichtlichen standpunkt gemeinverständlich dargestellt. E. Diederichs. 1925.
- Über Sinn und Sinngebilde, Verstehen und Erklären. Mohr. 1929.
- Heinrich Gomperz, Daniel Robinson (1953). Philosophical Studies. Christopher Pub. House.
