= Shock diamond =

Visible wave pattern in a supersonic exhaust plume

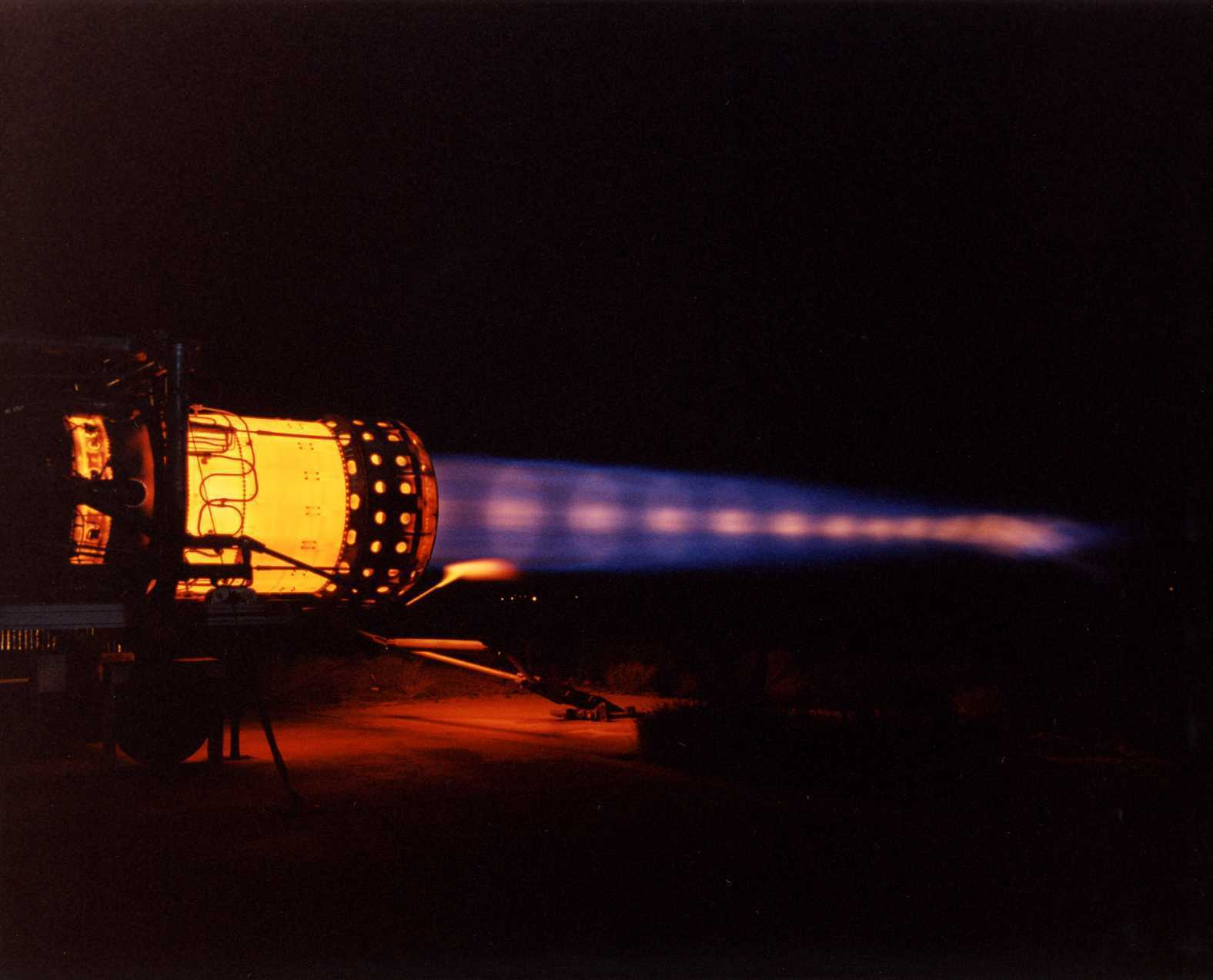
Shock diamonds are the bright areas seen in the exhaust of this statically mounted Pratt & Whitney J58 engine on full afterburner.

Shock diamonds (also known as Mach diamonds or thrust diamonds, and less commonly Mach disks) are a formation of standing wave patterns that appear in the supersonic exhaust plume of an aerospace propulsion system, such as a supersonic jet engine, rocket, ramjet, or scramjet, when it is operated in an atmosphere. The "diamonds" are actually a complex flow field made visible by abrupt changes in local density and pressure as the exhaust passes through a series of standing shock waves and expansion fans. The physicist Ernst Mach was the first to describe a strong shock perpendicular to the direction of fluid flow, the presence of which causes the diamond pattern.

== Mechanism ==
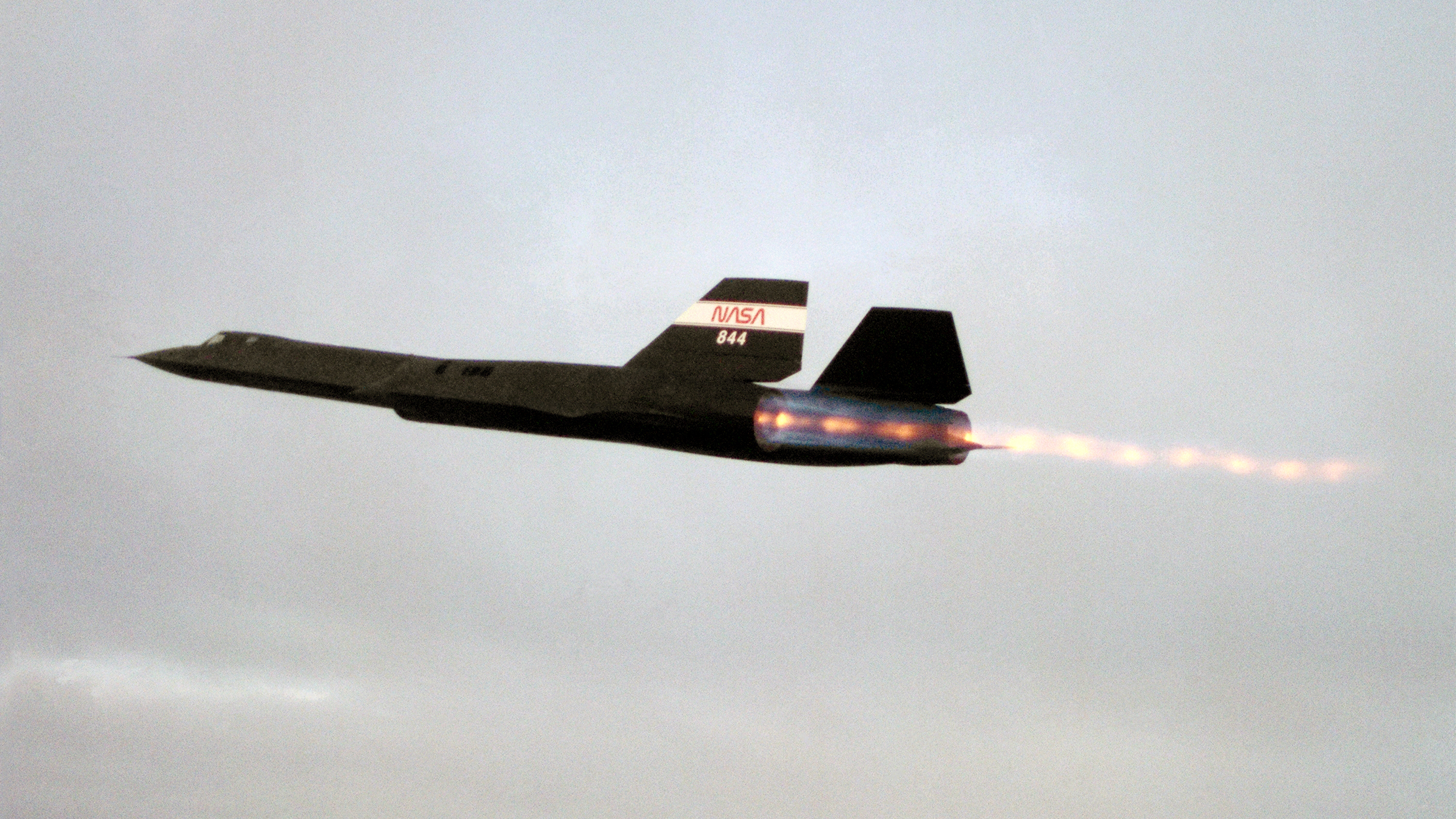
Shock diamonds behind a Lockheed SR-71 Blackbird.

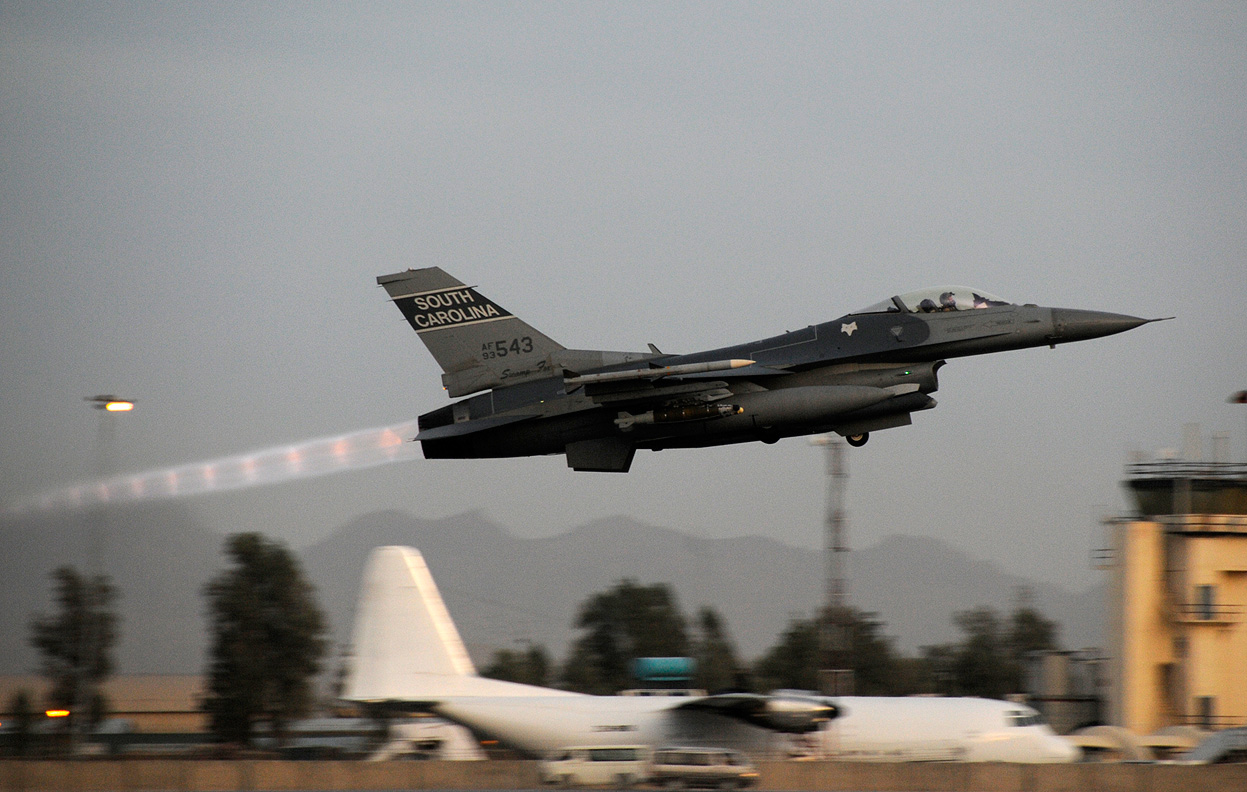
Shock diamonds behind a General Dynamics F-16 Fighting Falcon using afterburner.

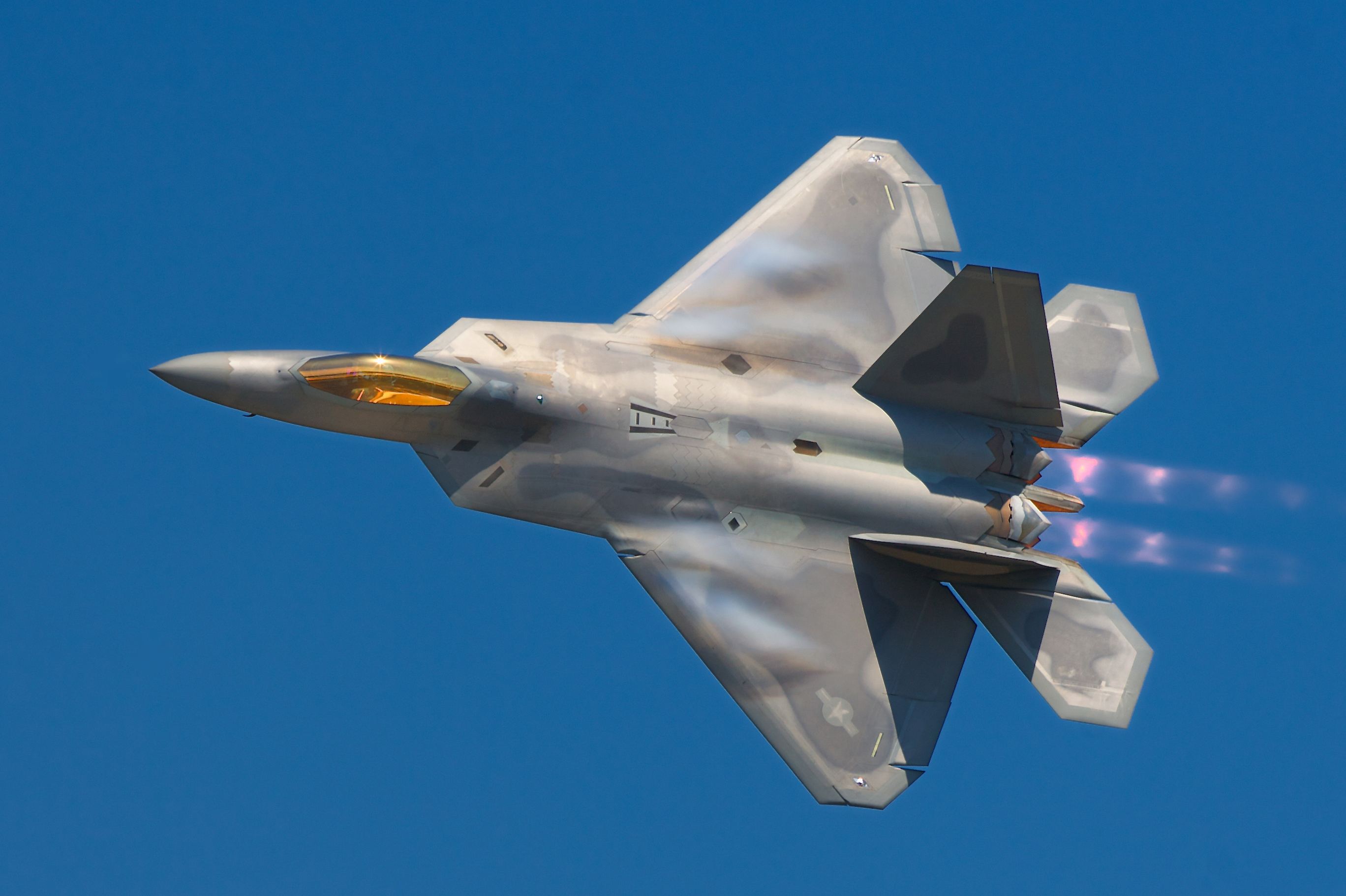
A Lockheed Martin F-22 Raptor with shock diamonds behind it.

Shock diamonds form when the supersonic exhaust from a propelling nozzle is slightly over-expanded, meaning that the static pressure of the gases exiting the nozzle is less than the ambient air pressure. The higher ambient pressure compresses the flow, and since the resulting pressure increase in the exhaust gas stream is adiabatic, a reduction in velocity causes its static temperature to be substantially increased. The exhaust is typically over-expanded at low altitudes where air pressure is higher.

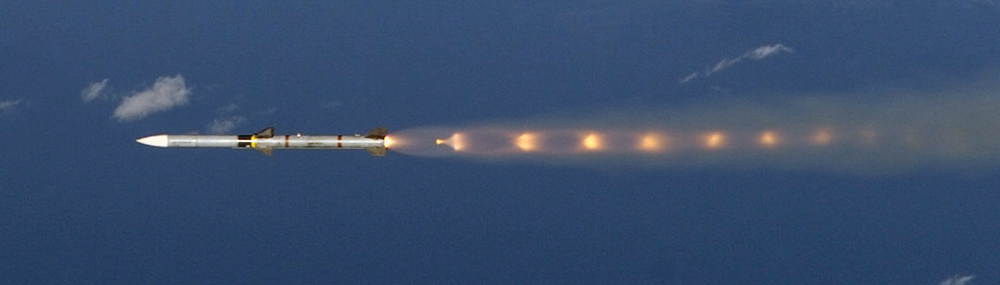
An AIM-120C Advanced Medium-Range Air-to-Air Missile exhibiting shock diamonds.

As the flow exits the nozzle, ambient air pressure will compress the flow. The external compression is caused by oblique shock waves inclined at an angle to the flow. The compressed flow is alternately expanded by Prandtl-Meyer expansion fans, and each diamond is formed by the pairing of an oblique shock with an expansion fan. When the compressed flow becomes parallel to the center line, a shock wave perpendicular to the flow forms, called a normal shock wave or Mach disk. This locates the first shock diamond, and the space between it and the nozzle is called the "zone of silence". The distance from the nozzle to the first shock diamond can be approximated by
$$x = 0.67 D_0 \sqrt{\frac{P_0}{P_1}},$$
where $x$ is the distance, $D_0$ is the nozzle diameter, $P_0$ is the chamber pressure, and $P_1$ is atmospheric pressure.

As the exhaust passes through the normal shock wave, its temperature increases, igniting excess fuel and causing the glow that makes the shock diamonds visible. The illuminated regions either appear as disks or diamonds, giving them their characteristic name.

Eventually the flow expands enough so that its pressure is again below ambient, at which point the expansion fan reflects from the contact discontinuity (i.e., the outer edge of the flow). The reflected waves, called the compression fan, cause the flow to compress. If the compression fan is strong enough, another oblique shock wave will form, creating a second Mach disk and shock diamond. The pattern of disks and diamonds would repeat indefinitely if the gases were ideal and frictionless; however, turbulent shear at the contact discontinuity causes the wave pattern to dissipate with distance.

Diamond patterns can similarly form when a nozzle is under-expanded (i.e., exit pressure higher than ambient) in a lower atmospheric pressure environment at higher altitudes. In this case, the expansion fan is first to form, followed by the oblique shock.

== Alternative sources ==
Shock diamonds are most commonly associated with jet and rocket propulsion, but they can form in other systems as well.

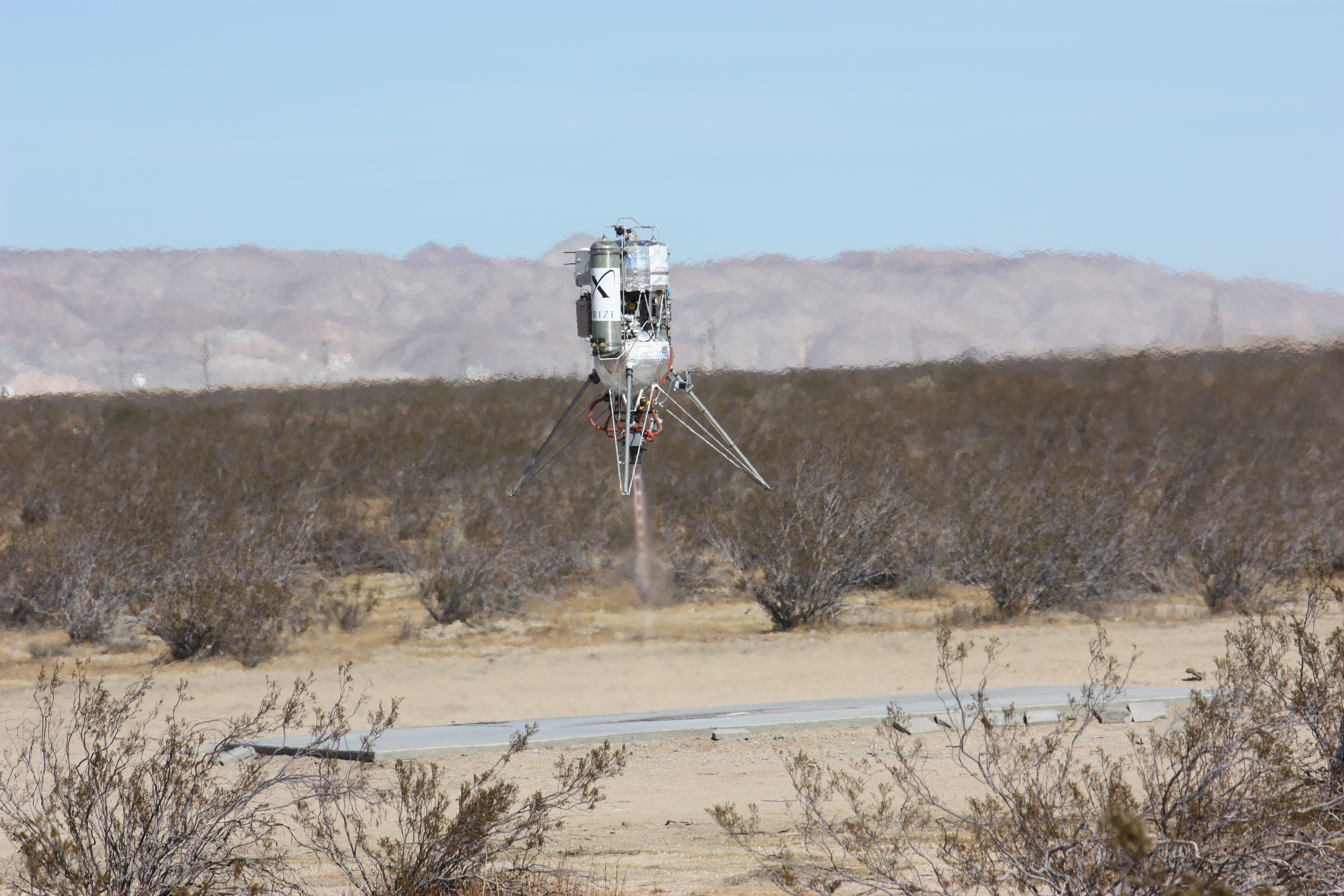
Shock diamonds beneath Masten Space Systems Xoie rocket during the Lunar Lander Challenge competition-winning landing.

=== Artillery ===
When artillery pieces are fired, gas exits the cannon muzzle at supersonic speeds and produces a series of shock diamonds. The diamonds cause a bright muzzle flash which can expose the location of gun emplacements to the enemy. It was found that when the ratio between the flow pressure and atmospheric pressure is close, which can be achieved with a flash suppressor, the shock diamonds were greatly minimized. Adding a muzzle brake to the end of the muzzle balances the pressures and prevents shock diamonds.

=== Radio jets ===
Some radio jets—powerful jets of plasma that emanate from quasars and radio galaxies—are observed to have regularly spaced knots of enhanced radio emissions. The jets travel at supersonic speed through a thin "atmosphere" of gas in space, so it is hypothesized that these knots are shock diamonds.

== See also ==
- Index of aviation articles
- Plume (hydrodynamics)
- Rocket engine nozzle
