= Firefighter (album) =

Studio album by Jason Lo
- Released: 10 April 2002
- Recorded: 2000–2002
- Studios: Synchrosound Studios (Petaling Jaya, Selangor)
- Genres: Alternative pop, progressive rock
- Length: 43:34
- Label: Fat Boys Records
- Producer: Jason Lo

Jason Lo chronology
| Days Without Dawn (1999) | Firefighter (2002) | The Fall (2005) |

Singles from Firefighter
- 1. "Rise and Fall" Released: 2001; 2. "Not My Problem" Released: 2001; 3. "The End of the Universe" Released: 2002

Firefighter is the second studio album by Malaysian singer-songwriter, Jason Lo (credited as LO), released on 10 April 2002 by Fat Boys Records.

== Production ==
Firefighter was the second LP release from Jason Lo, following the massive success of his debut studio album, Days Without Dawn (1999), which was sold over 10,000 copies. The album was recorded primarily at Synchrosound Studios in Petaling Jaya, Selangor. On the album title, which he described it as an allusion to one's personal battle, Lo said: "Everyone fights fires of their own. There is always little battle that everyone has inside of them". After a period of introspection and contemplation, he decided to stick with heavy guitar riffs and soulful melodies.

Lo's younger sister, Sara-Jane Lo provided backing vocals for two tracks - the title track and "Rise and Fall". Lo plays lead guitars and rhythm guitars on all tracks, as well as plays bass on "Rise and Fall" and keyboards on "The End of the Universe". Three drummers played on the album. Jojet Mohamed played drums on "Not My Problem", while Luke Mason played drums on the title track and "Rock N' Roll"; Effendy "Sotong" Mokhtar played drums for the rest of the album. Other musicians including Jamie Wilson who plays lead guitar on three tracks, Steve Thornton who plays percussion on "Rise and Fall" and Alexander Artamonov who plays trumpet on "Rock N' Roll".

The cover art photography features a toy fire truck and an inscription reads "In case of fire, call 911" and "Emergency call". In the booklet, there are also images of Lo acting as a fireman, which dated 12 July 2001 and is dedicated to firefighters around the world, as seen in the album's inlay. The album was produced and recorded by Jason Lo, mixed by Big Nick and mastered by Howie Weinberg at the Masterdisk.

== Release and reception ==
Firefighter was released on 10 April 2002, with "Rise and Fall" released as the first single. "Not My Problem" and "The End of the Universe" were later released as further singles. The album was well-received.

== Track listing ==
All tracks are written by Jason Lo.

| No. | Title | Length |
|---|---|---|
| 1. | "Grade 'A' Student" | 3:52 |
| 2. | "Firefighter" | 3:50 |
| 3. | "Not My Problem" | 3:25 |
| 4. | "Driving" | 4:08 |
| 5. | "Wonder" | 4:14 |
| 6. | "Rise and Fall" | 3:23 |
| 7. | "The End of the Universe" | 3:42 |
| 8. | "Spider" | 4:16 |
| 9. | "Sail Away" | 3:51 |
| 10. | "Rock N' Roll" | 5:27 |
| Total length: | | 43:34 |

== Credits and personnel ==
The credits are adapted from the album's booklet liner notes.

Performers and musicians

- Jason Lo - vocals (all tracks), lead guitars (all tracks), rhythm guitars (all tracks), bass (tracks 6), keyboards (track 7)
- Sara-Jane Lo - backing vocals (tracks 2 and 6)
- Fauzi "Aji" Samin - solo guitars (tracks 6, 9 and 10)
- Jamie Wilson - lead guitars (tracks 3, 4 and 8)
- Pacai - bass (tracks 1–5 and 8–10), bassline (track 2)
- Jojet Mohamed - drums (track 3)
- Effendy "Sotong" Mokhtar - drums (tracks 1, 4, 5, 8–10)
- Luke Mason - drums (tracks 2 and 10)
- Steve Thornton - percussion (track 6)
- Judy Lee - alto saxophone (track 10)
- Greg Lyons - tenor saxophone (track 10)
- Chee Chow Ming - trombone (track 10)
- Alexander Artamonov - trumpet (track 10)

Technical and production

- Jason Lo - producer, recorder
- Nick Blasband - executive producer, mixer
- Ali Nassiri - artwork (uncredited)
- Howie Weinberg - mastering
- Synchrosound Studios - recording and mixing studio
- Masterdisk - mastering studio

== Release history ==
Release history
| Region | Date | Format(s) | Label | Ref. |
|---|---|---|---|---|
| Malaysia | April 10, 2002 | CD; music download; streaming | Fat Boys Records, Universal Music Malaysia | |
