= Morris Bender =

American neuroscientist (1905–1983)

- Born: 1905; Uman, Russian Empire
- Died: January 23, 1983 (aged 77–78); New York City, United States
- Occupations: Neuroscientist; professor
- Children: 5

Morris Bender (1905 – January 23, 1983) was an American neuroscientist and professor of neurology at the Mount Sinai School of Medicine. Bender was among the most widely published neurologists of his generation, publishing more than two hundred peer-reviewed articles. His textbook, Disorders in Perception (1952), remains highly influential.

== Life and career ==
Morris Bender was born in 1905 in Uman, Russian Empire (now in present-day Ukraine). He was brought to Philadelphia when he was a child. He attended college and medical school at the University of Pennsylvania. In 1933, he joined the faculty of Mount Sinai and became chairman of the neurology department in 1951.

Bender was a leading researcher on the ocular motor system. His work clarified how the brain sends signals that move the eye and resulted in significant advances in therapy for brain tumors. He also developed the first test for detecting spinal cord lesions.

Bender is best known today for pioneering non-surgical treatments for subdural hematomas.

Bender died on January 23, 1983 at the age of 78, suffering from a heart attack. He was survived by his wife, two daughters, and three sons.
