= Jennifer Lopez (disambiguation) =

Jennifer Lopez (born 1969) is an American singer and actress.

Jennifer Lopez may also refer to:

- Jennifer Lopez (meteorologist), American meteorologist
- "Jennifer Lopez", a song from the Xiu Xiu EP Chapel of the Chimes
