= Disagree (band) =

Malaysian rock band

- Origin: Kuala Lumpur, Malaysia
- Genre: Alternative rock
- Years active: 1995–2011; 2023–present
- Labels: Fat Boys Records (2003–2010); Virtual Event Platform Asia (2023–present)
- Members: Mohamed Zahid Yon (vocals); Hamka (drums); Taa (bass)
- Past members: Lan; Amir; Ashroff; Aziz; David
- Website: disagreebandmusic.com

Disagree is a Malaysian rock band formed in Kuala Lumpur in 1995. Currently consists of Zahid (vocals, guitars), Hamka (drums) and Taa (bass), the band rose to fame during the 2000s.

Disagree achieved their biggest success with their debut album At the End of the Day in 2004, with notable singles like "Crumbs", "Suicide Note" and "Scarecrow Adams". After the release of their second album, To Prevent the Earth from Moving with You (2009), which yielded two lead singles "Osaka" and "Haley", the band went on long hiatus in 2011. The band reformed in 2023 and made their official comeback in May 2026 with the release of "Let's Do It All Again" as the first single from their third album Black & White in Colour, their first official recording release in 17 years.

== History ==
Disagree was formed in 1995 by two high school students Zahid and Hamka. They initially to use other names for their band before settling on the current band name, which they named Disagree. Together with other band members Lan and Amir, the quartet gigged and KL and recorded their first demo, Never Cry Wolf in 1996. According to Zahid, the studio in which they recorded it was Bach & Traz, and it appeared that they were the last band to record in the studio which closed down a week later. He added that they managed to record 10 songs, of which only two were salvaged for the frequent gigging list.

It was not until interest was sparked in 1997 by Miracle Music, a small independent label, did Disagree record their second demo, untitled. However, the dream faded quickly due to internal label obscurities and their hopes were dashed. Since then, members were focusing their interests on other things and the band took a hiatus from the scene for two years.

Disagree resurfaced when Zahid and Hamka responded to a rumour that a rock concert would be held somewhere in Kuala Lumpur. In fact, there was really one, which is the first Rock the World being held in 1 Utama just outside the capital. The band played to 10,000 people, who then motivated the band to come together again and record music. However, Lan and Amir departed soon after, eventually replaced by Aziz and Ashroff.

In 2001, Disagree released their debut EP entitled Homemade Jam that quickly gained popularity. The demo gained radio airplay on the now-defunct Wow FM as well as hitz.fm and various magazines voted the demo the most popular and groundbreaking demo to be reviewed.

The band started to become more actively involved in the scene as they stepped into the shoes of gig organizers. In 2002, they promoted their music in the Fat Ant Music Festival. Later that same year, Disagree opened for Rock the World II, one of their biggest achievements to date and continued to join the line-up for subsequent Rock the Worlds. Since then they have become a staple offering in the annual Rock the World.

It was around the time of Rock the World III when Fat Boys Records, an independent record label run by Jason Lo who signed grunge bands Naked Breed, showed interest on Disagree.

With talks beginning in 2003, Disagree went prepared to record of their début album. Within 10 months, including the mastering in California, they completed their debut 11-track album At the End of the Day for release on 10 February 2004. The album was well received and spawned four singles: "Crumbs", "Suicide Note", "Scarecrow Adams" and "The Enemy".

In 2005, Disagree began picking up awards beginning with the Award for Most Airplay in hitz.fm's inaugural Malaysian English Top 10 Awards, followed by Best New English Language Artiste at the 12th Anugerah Industri Muzik.

In 2006, they collaborated with Pop Shuvit to make a song and music video dedicated to football fans during the 2006 FIFA World Cup. The song was titled "Football Mad Nation" and the making of the song and video was sponsored by Celcom.

In 2007, Disagree became part of Nokia You Make It Reel, a competition for aspiring music video directors. Later that same year, they joined Ikon Malaysia. The band launched their second album, To Prevent the Earth from Moving with You, on 30 June 2009, with "Osaka", "Haley" and "The Tiniest Moment" was released as the lead singles.

In 2011, the band entered a hiatus, during which band members focused on family and work commitments. The band reunited in mid 2023 without telling fans and media beforehand, and made their official comeback in May 2026 by released their new single, "Let's Do It All Again". Disagree's third album, Black & White in Colour, was released on 24 October in conjunction with their showcase at the REXKL. It is their first official recording release in 17 years since To Prevent the Earth from Moving with You.

== Style ==
The band, like most Malaysian rock bands, performs songs in English.

== Band members ==
=== Current members ===
- Zahid (lead vocals, lead guitar) (1995–present)
- Hamka (drums) (1995–present)
- Taa (bass) (2015–present)

=== Former members ===
- Lan (rhythm guitar) (1995–1999)
- Amir (bass) (1995–1999)
- Aziz (bass) (1999–2011)
- Ashroff (rhythm guitar) (2000–2008)
- David (rhythm guitar) (2008–2011)

Timeline

== Discography ==
=== Studio albums ===
Title	Album details
At the End of the Day	Released: 10 February 2004; Label: Fat Boys Records, Universal Music Malaysia; Format: CD, cassette, digital download, streaming
To Prevent the Earth from Moving with You	Released: 30 June 2009; Label: Fat Boys Records, Universal Music Malaysia; Format: CD, digital download, streaming
Black & White in Colour	Released: 24 October 2026; Label: Virtual Event Platform Asia; Format: CD, digital download, streaming

=== Demo ===
Title	Demo details
Never Cry Wolf	Released: 1996; Label: Independent; Format: Cassette

=== EP ===
Title	EP details
Homemade Jam	Released: 2001; Label: Independent; Format: CD, cassette

=== Singles ===
Title	Year	Album
"Crumbs"	2003	At the End of the Day
"Suicide Note"	2004	At the End of the Day
"Scarecrow Adams"	2004	At the End of the Day
"The Enemy"	2005	At the End of the Day
"Pooch"	2005	At the End of the Day
"Football Mad Nation" (with Pop Shuvit)	2006	Non-album single
"Osaka"	2009	To Prevent the Earth from Moving with You
"Haley"	2009	To Prevent the Earth from Moving with You
"The Tiniest Moment"	2010	To Prevent the Earth from Moving with You
"Let's Do It All Again"	2026	Black & White in Colour
"Home"	2026	Black & White in Colour
"The Lie"	2026	Black & White in Colour
"Oceans"	2026	Black & White in Colour

== Awards and nominations ==
Awards and nominations received by Disagree
Award	Year	Recipient(s) and nominee(s)	Category	Result	Ref(s)
Anugerah Industri Muzik	2005	Disagree	Best New Local English Artiste	Won	
Anugerah Industri Muzik	2005	At the End of the Day	Best Local English Album	Nominated	
Anugerah Industri Muzik	2010	To Prevent the Earth from Moving with You	Best Album Cover	Won	
Anugerah Industri Muzik	2010	To Prevent the Earth from Moving with You	Best Local English Album	Won	
Anugerah Industri Muzik	2010	"Osaka"	Best Local English Song	Nominated	
Anugerah Industri Muzik	2010	"Osaka"	Best Music Video	Nominated	
Anugerah Industri Muzik	2010	"Haley"	Best Local English Song	Nominated	
Anugerah Industri Muzik	2010	"Haley"	Best Music Video	Nominated	
