= Arthur Lester Benton =

American neuropsychologist and professor

- Born: October 16, 1909; New York City, U.S.
- Died: December 27, 2006 (aged 97); Glenview, Illinois, U.S.
- Education: Columbia University
- Scientific career
- Fields: Neurology, psychology
- Workplaces: University of Iowa
- Doctoral advisor: Carney Landis
- Doctoral students: Albert Bandura

Arthur Lester Benton (October 16, 1909 – December 27, 2006) was an American neuropsychologist and Emeritus Professor of Neurology and Psychology at the University of Iowa.

== Biography ==
He received his A.B. from Oberlin College in 1931, his A.M. from Oberlin College in 1933 and his Ph.D. from Columbia University in 1935. He acquired his training as a psychologist at the Payne Whitney Psychiatric Clinic of New York Hospital. Early in 1941, Benton volunteered for service in the U.S. Navy and was commissioned as a lieutenant in the medical department. His active duty lasted until 1945, followed by many years of service in the U.S. Navy Reserve, retiring at the rank of captain. In 1946 Benton accepted an appointment as associate professor of Psychology at the University of Louisville. In 1948, he moved to the University of Iowa as professor and director of graduate training in clinical psychology. In 1958 he became professor of psychology and neurology, retiring in 1978, at which time the Benton Laboratory of Neuropsychology in the Division of Behavioral Neurology was dedicated. At Iowa he supervised 46 doctoral dissertations and 24 master's theses. He was the author of numerous books and the creator of a number of neuropsychological testing instruments, including the Benton Visual Retention Test (BVRT).He was the husband of the late Professor Rita Benton, Professor of Musicology at the University of Iowa, and father of Raymond Stetson Benton, Abigail Benton Sivan, and Daniel Joseph Benton.

== See also ==
- Judgment of Line Orientation
