= Judgment of Line Orientation =

Standardized test of visuospatial skills

- Test of: Parietal lobe

Judgment of Line Orientation (JLO) is a standardized test of visuospatial skills commonly associated with functioning of the parietal lobe in the right hemisphere. The test measures a person's ability to match the angle and orientation of lines in space. Subjects are asked to match two angled lines to a set of 11 lines that are arranged in a semicircle and separated 18 degrees from each other. The complete test has 30 items, but short forms have also been created. There is normative data available for ages 7-96.

In 1994, Arthur L. Benton developed the test from his study of the effects of a right hemisphere lesion on spatial skills.

== Clinical performances ==
In a study measuring JLO scores and on-road performance, JLO was correlated with better backing-up scores.

=== Neurological disorders ===
Patients with the following disorders often fail the JLO test:

- Dementia
- William's syndrome
- Neurofibromatosis type I

Patients with dementia often perform poorly on this test. It has been suggested that patients with Parkinson's disease perform poorly because of the complexity of task demands, not due to visuospatial deficits.

=== Psychiatric disorders ===
Studies performed on people with schizophrenia found no deficit in performance.

== Procedure ==
The test consists of five practice trials followed by 30 test items. It is suitable for adult and pediatric populations. The test has two forms, H and J, which present the same 30 trials but in different order. Responses to prompts can be pointed to or spoken.

=== Scoring ===
A score of 17 or less is considered a sign of severe deficit.

== See also ==
- Benton Visual Retention Test
- Oblique effect
- Orientation column
