= Shebby Singh =

Malaysian footballer (1960–2022)

Personal information
- Full name: Serbegeth Singh
- Date of birth: 20 August 1960
- Place of birth: Johor, Malaya
- Date of death: 12 January 2022 (aged 61)
- Place of death: Johor, Malaysia
- Height: 1.80 m (5 ft 11 in)
- Position: Defender

Senior career*
Years	Team	Apps	(Gls)
1978–1983	Johor FA		
1984–1990	Kuala Lumpur FA		
1991–1992	Pahang FA		
1993–1994	Kuala Lumpur FA		
1994–1995	Negeri Sembilan FA		
1995–1996	Perak FA		

International career
1982–1991	Malaysia		

Managerial career
- 2007: Melaka TMFC (caretaker)
- * Club domestic league appearances and goals

Serbegeth "Shebby" Singh (Punjabi: ਸਰਬੇਤਥ ਸਿੰਘ, romanized: Sarabētatha sigha; 20 August 1960 – 12 January 2022) was a Malaysian professional footballer who played as a defender. After retiring, he worked as a coach as well as a sports broadcaster in Asia. He was Blackburn Rovers' Global Adviser during the 2012–13 season.

== Playing career ==
Singh started his football career for Johor FA, before moving to Federal Territory in 1983, for which he was suspended from playing for a year by Johor FA for allegedly moving without permission. He was chiefly associated with Kuala Lumpur FA, and was part of the team which won the Malaysia Cup three consecutive seasons (1987–1989). He also played with Negeri Sembilan FA and Pahang FA before ending his career with Perak FA in 1996.

He played nine years of international football for Malaysia, including in three Asian Games (1982, 1986 and 1990), and was a South East Asian Games gold medallist in 1989.

His career in domestic football lasted eighteen years from 1978 to 1996. He won every domestic honour, including the Malaysia Cup, Malaysian FA Cup and League Championship.

== Coaching and media career ==
In 2006, Singh coached a football team named 'MyTeam' for a Malaysian reality television show. The squad was mainly composed of amateur Malaysian footballers. During the series, the team visited the training grounds of Manchester United, where they faced a selection of United players. The game ended in a goalless draw. 'MyTeam2' was broadcast in 2007. They lost 2–0 to the Indonesian football team.

In 2007, Singh was appointed technical advisor to Malaysia Super League club Melaka TMFC. He also had a brief stint as caretaker head coach of the club after the sacking of previous coach Irfan Bakti Abu Salim. He only lasted one year at the club.

Singh appeared as a football analyst on South East Asian television.

== Blackburn Rovers ==
On 18 June 2012, Venky's, the owners of Blackburn Rovers, appointed Singh as global adviser at the club. On 29 December 2012, he appeared on sports programme 6–0–6 on BBC Radio 5 Live. He confirmed to presenters Robbie Savage and Darren Fletcher that the club's former manager, Steve Kean, had in fact resigned from the club as opposed to reports in the press claiming he was sacked. Singh also described his appointment of Henning Berg as a "mistake that he regretted". Berg's managerial reign lasted just ten games and 57 days.

Singh denied reports that he had taken over training sessions and stated the club's next manager would be a man with experience, ruling out Scottish coach Kevin MacDonald. In spite of this, the inexperienced manager of Blackpool F.C., Michael Appleton, was appointed the club's new manager, unleashing strong criticism from Blackburn fans.

Singh was instrumental in the dismissal of Appleton, who lasted 67 days in his job, ten days longer than his predecessor, Henning Berg. This managerial unrest saw his popularity among Blackburn supporters drop further. During this time, he was accused of 'presiding over the farcical decline of the club', according to one of The Independent article. Singh had not returned to the club after three months on leave, his only presence being a short visit to sack Appleton, whom he had never met.

== Personal life and death ==
Singh died on 12 January 2022, at the age of 61. It is believed that he had collapsed due to shortness of breath while cycling in Iskandar Puteri, Johor, according to Bernama. His post mortem showed blockages in three coronary arteries. Footballer Aidil Zafuan said that he saw Singh beforehand, and recalled that Singh looked 'tired' and 'pale' although he had just started cycling. Singh was cremated at Shamshan Bhoomi Hall, Kuala Lumpur.

== See also ==
- List of Sikh footballers
