= Jason Lo =

- Born: Jason Jonathan Lo; 27 April 1975 (age 51); Kuching, Sarawak, Malaysia
- Other names: Lo, J Lo
- Education: University of Hull
- Occupations: Singer, musician, music producer, DJ, entrepreneur
- Years active: 1996–present
- Spouse(s): Ann Ibrahim (divorced); Jazzabella
- Children: 3
- Musical career
- Genre: Rock
- Instruments: Vocals; guitar
- Label: Fat Boys Records

Jason Jonathan Lo (born 27 April 1975) is a Malaysian music artist, music producer, DJ, entrepreneur and former chief executive officer of Tune Talk. He is sometimes known by the nicknames Lo and J Lo.

== Early life ==
Lo was born in Kuching, Sarawak, to a Chinese father and Irish mother. He was educated in Singapore and the United Kingdom. He graduated from the University of Hull with a BSc in accounting, and then did an MBA in Finance at Webster Graduate School in London, before returning to Malaysia to pursue a career in the music industry.

== Music career ==
In 1996, Lo recorded a ten-track demo in England with his band 'Sunday Man'. In 1997, he recorded another ten-track album with his renamed band 'Drop Circle'. In 1998, the band went their separate ways and Lo returned to Malaysia. His first Malaysian album, the self-financed Days Without Dawn, was released in Malaysia at the end of 1999. Since then, he has released two further albums – Firefighter (2002) and The Fall (2005). Days Without Dawn sold over 10,000 copies to date. Whereas The Fall sold 5,000 copies despite rampant digital downloads.

Lo was the first Southeast Asian artist to reach the top 3 on Pepsi Top 20 international chart. His songs 'Evening News' and 'So Julie' were No. 1 on the Malaysian Top 10 for 7 and 5 weeks respectively. 'Evening News' was also included as a pre-loaded track on Creative Labs' original Creative NOMAD Jukebox for release in the US Lo's music videos have had regional airplay on both MTV Asia and Channel V. He has been a winner of the Asian People's Choice Award for Much Music Asia, and at the Malaysian MTV Music Video Awards.

He has been nominated for six AIM Awards (local Malaysian music awards), and for MTV Viewers' Choice Awards. He has headlined live events in Malaysia, and also been an opening act for top international touring bands including Deep Purple, Good Charlotte and Big Country.

Lo is also the CEO of his own record label and event promotion company, Fat Boys Records. He has produced albums for Malaysian bands including Disagree and SingleTrackMind, and organised a series of successful concerts called 'Rock the World', which showcased Malaysian talent.

Lo has also worked as a DJ at the Malaysian radio station hitz.fm, and been a TV talk show host on the show Latte@8 on 8TV in 2004.

== Sports ==
In 2006, Lo teamed-up with the Malaysian politician Khairy Jamaluddin (who he attended high school with in Singapore at the United World College of South East Asia) to produce the reality TV show MyTeam.

The show, which was televised on TV3, brought together a squad of unknown soccer players selected at trials held around Malaysia to form a team to take on the Malaysian national football team in an exhibition match. The event drew much publicity, and MyTeam put up a creditable performance in losing 2–1 against the national side. MyTeam were invited to enter the Malaysian Premier League in 2007. The team merged with an existing club, Perak UPB FC, to form UPB-MyTeam FC, at which Khairy Jamaluddin became the President and Lo the Deputy President. After finishing runners-up in the Premier League in 2007, the club was promoted to the Malaysian Super League for the 2008 season. A second season of the show, MyTeam2, was broadcast in 2007

== Finance ==
In December 2007, Lo was appointed the chief executive officer of Tune Talk, a no-frills mobile virtual network operator, owned by Tune Ventures Sdn Bhd, in which AirAsia Group Chief Executive Tony Fernandes holds a 40% stake. He was later replaced by Ameen Amaedran Abdullah on 12 January 2018.

== Legal troubles ==
In November 2017, Lo denied media reports that he had been detained in Dubai, UAE on September 18, 2017, which alleged that authorities found drugs in his luggage.

Lo said he was sent to the police lock-up in the UAE because he tried to help his friend who attempted to break up a fight and he had grappled with a man who turned out to be an undercover cop. The Inspector General of Police later clarified that Lo's detention in Dubai was due to a scuffle, and was not a drugs case as earlier reports had suggested. Lo claimed that the undercover policeman delayed making his statement for weeks leading to a prolonged spell in detention.

In May 2019, Lo threatened legal action against The Star over an expose on a former Telco CEO. Lo slammed the English daily for “indecently and irresponsibly” printing a front-page story that he said had omitted key facts.

Following the report, Bukit Aman Criminal Investigations Director Datuk Huzir Mohamed said they would review 17 police reports made by Lo's ex-wife, at least some of which had earlier been designated "no further action".

In November 2019, Lo was charged with trespassing into a house and injecting a drug into his body. He pleaded not guilty to charges read in separate magistrates’ Courts. He was charged under Section 448 of the Penal Code with trespassing into a house in Bangsar Park, Brickfields at 10 pm, on October 30, which carries a maximum jail term of three years or a fine of up to RM5,000 or both.

In September 2020, Lo and his colleague Muhammad Yakub Hussaini, both directors of Fat Boys Records Sdn Bhd, pleaded not guilty at the Sessions Court to a charge of breach of trust of money belonging to a recording company amounting to RM232,500, by fraudulently utilising the money for personal use.

In August 2021, The Vibes reported that Lo would be suing national news agency Bernama over alleged defamatory statements contained in their news reports made in November 2019 and September 2020.

He also claimed trial to the charge of injecting the drug methamphetamine into his body in the office toilet of the Narcotics Crime Investigation Division of the Brickfields police headquarters on Travers Road, at 5.15 pm, on November 15.

In June 2022, Lo was acquitted of all charges without having to enter a defense as the Judge ruled the prosecution failed to raise a prima facie case against him.

In May 2023, he lost his defamation suit against Bernama and was ordered by the court to pay RM15,000 in damages.

On Nov 9, 2023 the Shah Alam High Court ruled in Lo's favour in his defamation suit against the Star Media Group and three employees including chief editor Esther Ng.

It ruled that two articles and a social media post published in May 2019 referred to Lo and that the articles were defamatory.

The Court also found that the defendants had overstepped the boundaries of responsible journalism in the publication of the 3 impugned articles. Lo was awarded RM200,000 as general damages and the costs of RM40,000.

On May 26, 2026, The Court of Appeal increased the damages awarded to Lo from RM200,000 to RM300,000 and ordered Star Media Group Bhd and the journalists to pay Lo RM50,000 in costs. The decision followed a ruling by a three-member bench chaired by Justice Collin Lawrence Sequerah, who allowed Lo’s cross-appeal on quantum.

== Personal life ==
Jason Lo previously married to Ann Ibrahim. They have 3 children. He was later married to Jazzabella.

== Discography ==
=== Studio albums ===
- Days Without Dawn (1999)
- Firefighter (2002)
- The Fall (2005)

=== Singles ===
- "Evening News" (1999)
- "So Julie" (2000)
- "Rise and Fall" (2001)
- "Not My Problem" (2001)
- "The End of the Universe" (2002)
- "Sleepy Head" (2005)
- "Operator, the Line is Dead" (2005)
- "Old Newspaper" (2007)
- "Hurricane" (2012)

== Filmography ==
Year	Title	Role	Note(s)
2004	Buli	Street bully	Special appearance

== Awards and accolades ==
- Sarawak Youth Icon and Sports Award 2011
  - Youth Icon – Entrepreneurship
