= Lateral inhibition =

Capacity of an excited neuron to reduce activity of its neighbors

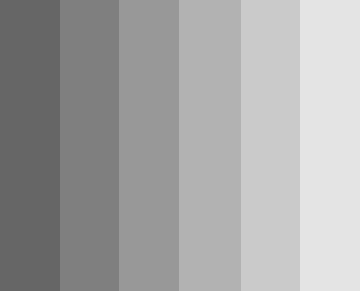
Along the boundary between adjacent shades of grey in the Mach bands illusion, lateral inhibition makes the darker area falsely appear even darker and the lighter area falsely appear even lighter.

In neurobiology, lateral inhibition is the capacity of an excited neuron to reduce the activity of its neighbors. Lateral inhibition disables the spreading of action potentials from excited neurons to neighboring neurons in the lateral direction. This creates a contrast in stimulation that allows increased sensory perception. It is also referred to as lateral antagonism and occurs primarily in visual processes, but also in tactile, auditory, and even olfactory processing. Cells that utilize lateral inhibition appear primarily in the cerebral cortex and thalamus and make up lateral inhibitory networks (LINs). Artificial lateral inhibition has been incorporated into artificial sensory systems, such as vision chips, hearing systems, and optical mice. An often under-appreciated point is that although lateral inhibition is visualised in a spatial sense, it is also thought to exist in what is known as "lateral inhibition across abstract dimensions." This refers to lateral inhibition between neurons that are not adjacent in a spatial sense, but in terms of modality of stimulus. This phenomenon is thought to aid in colour discrimination.

== History ==
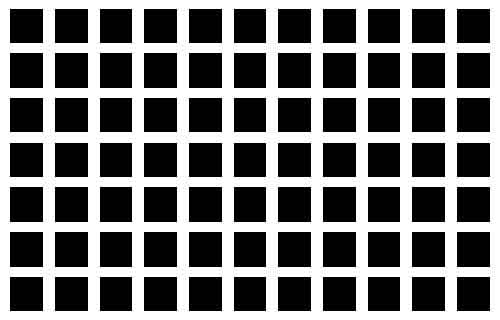
Optical illusion caused by lateral inhibition: the Hermann grid illusion

The concept of neural inhibition (in motor systems) was well known to Descartes and his contemporaries. Sensory inhibition in vision was inferred by Ernst Mach in 1865 as depicted in his mach band. Inhibition in single sensory neurons was discovered and investigated starting in 1949 by Haldan K. Hartline when he used algorithms to express the effect of Ganglion receptive fields. His algorithms also help explain the experiment conducted by David H. Hubel and Torsten Wiesel that expressed a variation of sensory processing, including lateral inhibition, within different species.

In 1956, Hartline revisited this concept of lateral inhibition in horseshoe crab (Limulus polyphemus) eyes, during an experiment conducted with the aid of Henry G Wagner and Floyd Ratliff. Hartline explored the anatomy of ommatidia in the horseshoe crab because of their similar function and physiological anatomy to photoreceptors in the human eye. Also, they are much larger than photoreceptors in humans, which would make them much easier to observe and record. Hartline contrasted the response signal of the ommatidium when a single concentrated beam of light was directed at one receptor unit as opposed to three surrounding units. He further supported his theory of lateral inhibition as the response signal of one unit was stronger when the surrounding units were not exposed to light.

== Sensory inhibition ==
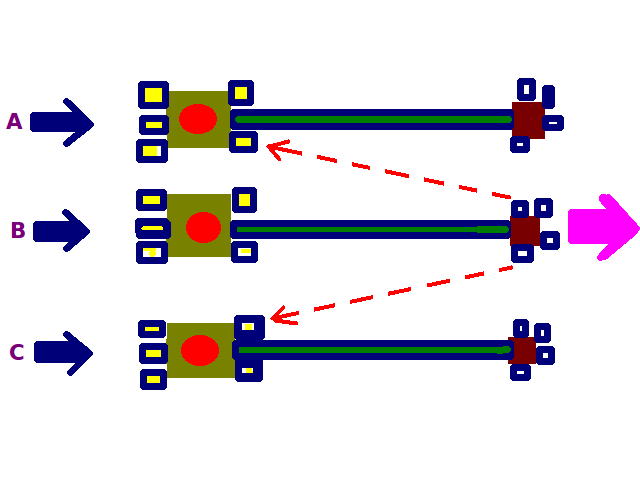
A stimulus affecting all three neurons, but which affects B strongest or first, can be sharpened if B sends lateral signals to neighbors A and C not to fire, thereby inhibiting them. Lateral inhibition is used in vision to sharpen signals to the brain (pink arrow).

Georg von Békésy, in his book Sensory Inhibition, explores a wide range of inhibitory phenomena in sensory systems, and interprets them in terms of sharpening.

=== Visual inhibition ===
Lateral inhibition increases the contrast and sharpness in visual response. This phenomenon already occurs in the mammalian retina. In the dark, a small light stimulus will enhance the different photoreceptors (rod cells). The rods in the center of the stimulus will transduce the "light" signal to the brain, whereas different rods on the outside of the stimulus will send a "dark" signal to the brain due to lateral inhibition from horizontal cells. This contrast between the light and dark creates a sharper image. (Compare unsharp masking in digital processing). This mechanism also creates the Mach band visual effect.

Visual lateral inhibition is the process in which photoreceptor cells aid the brain in perceiving contrast within an image. Electromagnetic light enters the eye by passing through the cornea, pupil, and the lens (optics). It then bypasses the ganglion cells, amacrine cells, bipolar cells, and horizontal cells in order to reach the photoreceptors rod cells which absorb light. The rods become stimulated by the energy from the light and release an excitatory neural signal to the horizontal cells.

This excitatory signal, however, will only be transmitted by the rod cells in the center of the ganglion cell receptive field to ganglion cells because horizontal cells respond by sending an inhibitory signal to the neighboring rods to create a balance that allows mammals to perceive more vivid images. The central rod will send the light signals directly to bipolar cells which in turn will relay the signal to the ganglion cells. Amacrine cells also produce lateral inhibition to bipolar cells and ganglion cells to perform various visual computations including image sharpening. The final visual signals will be sent to the thalamus and cerebral cortex, where additional lateral inhibition occurs.

=== Tactile inhibition ===
Sensory information collected by the peripheral nervous system is transmitted to specific areas of the primary somatosensory area in the parietal cortex according to its origin on any given part of the body. For each neuron in the primary somatosensory area, there is a corresponding region of the skin that is stimulated or inhibited by that neuron. The regions that correspond to a location on the somatosensory cortex are mapped by a homunculus. This corresponding region of the skin is referred to as the neuron's receptive field. The most sensitive regions of the body have the greatest representation in any given cortical area, but they also have the smallest receptive fields. The lips, tongue, and fingers are examples of this phenomenon. Each receptive field is composed of two regions: a central excitatory region and a peripheral inhibitory region. One entire receptive field can overlap with other receptive fields, making it difficult to differentiate between stimulation locations, but lateral inhibition helps to reduce that overlap. When an area of the skin is touched, the central excitatory region activates and the peripheral region is inhibited, creating a contrast in sensation and allowing sensory precision. The person can then pinpoint exactly which part of the skin is being touched. In the face of inhibition, only the neurons that are most stimulated and least inhibited will fire, so the firing pattern tends to concentrate at stimulus peaks. This ability becomes less precise as stimulation moves from areas with small receptive fields to larger receptive fields, e.g. moving from the fingertips to the forearm to the upper arm.

=== Auditory inhibition ===
Similarities between sensory processes of the skin and the auditory system suggest lateral inhibition could play a role in auditory processing. The basilar membrane in the cochlea has receptive fields similar to the receptive fields of the skin and eyes. Also, neighboring cells in the auditory cortex have similar specific frequencies that cause them to fire, creating a map of sound frequencies similar to that of the somatosensory cortex. Lateral inhibition in tonotopic channels can be found in the inferior colliculus and at higher levels of auditory processing in the brain. However, the role that lateral inhibition plays in auditory sensation is unclear. Some scientists found that lateral inhibition could play a role in sharpening spatial input patterns and temporal changes in sensation, others propose it plays an important role in processing low or high tones.

Lateral inhibition is also thought to play a role in suppressing tinnitus. Tinnitus can occur when damage to the cochlea creates a greater reduction of inhibition than excitation, allowing neurons to become aware of sound without sound actually reaching the ear. If certain sound frequencies that contribute to inhibition more than excitation are produced, tinnitus can be suppressed. Evidence supports findings that high-frequency sounds are best for inhibition and therefore best for reducing some types of tinnitus.

In mustached bats, evidence supports the hypothesis that lateral inhibitory processes of the auditory system contribute to improved auditory information processing. Lateral inhibition would occur in the medial and dorsal divisions of the medial geniculate nucleus of mustached bats, along with positive feedback. The exact functions of these regions are unclear, but they do contribute to selective auditory processing responses. These processes could play a role in auditory functioning of other mammals, such as cats.

== Embryology ==
In embryology, the concept of lateral inhibition has been adapted to describe processes in the development of cell types. Lateral inhibition is described as a part of the Notch signaling pathway, a type of cell–cell interaction. Specifically, during asymmetric cell division one daughter cell adopts a particular fate that causes it to be copy of the original cell and the other daughter cell is inhibited from becoming a copy. Lateral inhibition is well documented in flies, worms and vertebrates. In all of these organisms, the transmembrane proteins Notch and Delta (or their homologues) have been identified as mediators of the interaction. Research has been more commonly associated with Drosophila, the fruit fly. Synthetic embryologists have also been able to replicate lateral inhibition dynamics in developing bacterial colonies, creating stripes and regular structures.

A neuroblast with slightly more Delta protein on its cell surface will inhibit its neighboring cells from becoming neurons. In flies, frogs, and chicks, Delta is found in those cells that will become neurons, while Notch is elevated in those cells that become the glial cells.

== In plants ==
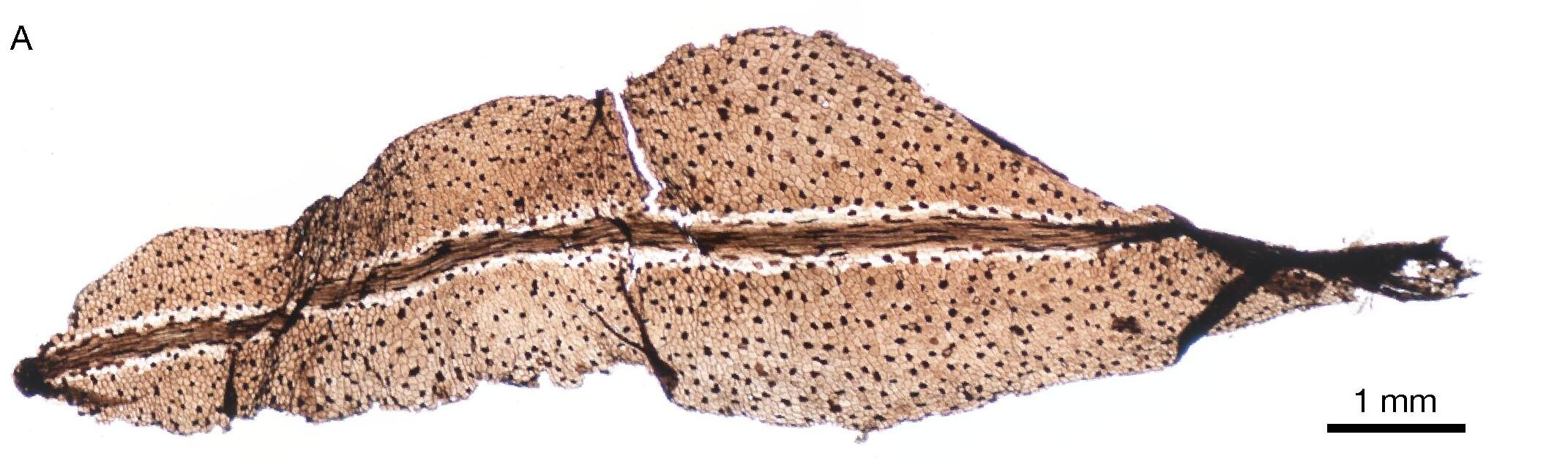
The Devonian fossil liverwort Metzgeriothalus sharonae, showing a thallus consisting of a midrib and unistratose wings with scattered dark cells. These dark cells (homologous to oil body cells of modern liverworts) form regular 'salt-and-pepper' patterns, a hallmark of lateral inhibition.

In plants, lateral inhibition has been shown to underlie the specification of various epidermal cell types, including trichomes and root hairs, rhizoids and complex oil body cells. Lateral inhibition has also been proposed in the fossil record: in the Devonian fossil Metzgeriothallus sharonae, the oldest known liverwort, exceptionally preserved dark cells interpreted as homologous to oil body cells of modern liverworts are arranged in 'salt-and-pepper' patterns, consistent with lateral inhibition interactions driving their spatial distribution. This represents one of the earliest indications of a conserved cell specification mechanism in land plants.

== See also ==
- Optical illusion
- Mach band
- Cornsweet illusion
- Grid illusion
- Range fractionation
- Edge effects
- Simultaneous contrast
