= Cornsweet =

Cornsweet is a surname. Notable people with the surname include:

- Al Cornsweet (1906–1991), American football player and coach
- Tom Cornsweet (1929–2017), American experimental psychologist
  - Cornsweet illusion
