= Pallaviciniites =

Pallaviciniites Temporal range: Frasnian

Scientific classification
- Kingdom: Plantae
- Division: Marchantiophyta
- Class: Jungermanniopsida
- Order: Metzgeriales
- Genus: †Pallaviciniites; Schuster 1966 (Hueber, 1961)
- Species: †P. devonicus

Binomial name
- †Pallaviciniites devonicus Schuster 1966 (Hueber, 1961)

Synonyms
- Hepaticites Hueber 1961

Species of liverwort

The lowermost Upper Devonian fossil Pallaviciniites was for a time the oldest known liverwort until Metzgeriothallus was recovered from earlier Devonian strata.

It had a central axis, and bifurcated at its tips; similar fossils have been found in younger strata through to the Pleistocene. With the exception of its elongated axial conducting (non-vascular) cells, the thallus was a single cell thick. It had a serrated margin.

Prior to its discovery, the oldest known liverworts dated to the Lower Carboniferous.
