= Dan Margulis =

Digital photograph color expert (born 1951)

Dan Margulis (born 21 December 1951) is an expert on color correction and reproduction of photographs, using Adobe Photoshop or similar software.

His Professional Photoshop series (first edition 1994, currently in its fifth edition, 2006) is widely viewed as an authoritative work in the field of digital color correction of photographs. His Photoshop LAB Color: The Canyon Conundrum and Other Adventures in the Most Powerful Colorspace (first edition 2005, second edition 2015) established the usage of L*a*b* as a standard part of the repertory of high-end retouchers. His magazine column, Makeready, which ran from 1993 to 2006, introduced many concepts in color handling that have since become accepted practice in the industry. The column appeared in several publications worldwide. In its later years, it was carried simultaneously by Electronic Publishing and Photoshop User magazines in the United States.

== Body of work ==
The work of Margulis is associated with the concept that digital color correction should seek to correspond to what a human observer would see if placed in the position of the camera. He popularized, but did not originate, a method he described as "color by the numbers", which requires the retoucher to verify that certain values in the digital file agree with known standards.

His techniques attempt to emulate certain well-known reactions/attributes of the human visual system, such as chromatic adaptation and simultaneous contrast. He has identified several other characteristics of human perception that he states should be taken into account when processing a digital image. These include assertions that humans prefer fuller and richer tonality in the quartertone region than cameras customarily provide, that humans subconsciously use saturation as a measure of an object's distance, and that humans do not focus on strongly colored objects as intensely as on more neutral ones.

Other theoretical suggestions made by Margulis include:

- In conversions from color to black and white, the objective is to identify areas of contrasting color and adjust them to substitute contrast in luminosity.
- Identification of the A channel of L*a*b* (usually written as LAB by imaging professionals) as operating on a magenta-green axis, as opposed to the red-green axis described in previous technical works.

Image-processing techniques published or authored by Margulis include:

- The concept of assigning important image regions to the steepest parts of input-output channel curves ("the steeper the curve, the more the contrast").
- Use of channel blending to enhance detail in weaker channels.
- Overlay blending to enhance highlight and/or shadow detail.
- Using different styles of black generation (gray component replacement, or GCR) to avoid press problems or to make color correction easier.
- Unsharp masking by channel rather than overall.
- Emphasizing the darkening function of sharpening at the expense of lightening.
- The "Man from Mars Method" of driving colors apart without regard to whether gray balance is altered.
- LAB as a primary tool in color correction.
- Blurring the AB channels of LAB to reduce colored noise.
- Assigning a "false profile" to an RGB image so that it will be interpreted as lighter during subsequent conversions.
- High Radius, Low Amount ("hiraloam") method of unsharp masking.
- Uniting separate versions of the same image through use of masks that, although based on the original photograph, have been blurred beyond recognition.

At a presentation to MIT faculty and graduate students in 2007, Margulis introduced the "picture-postcard workflow", which he claimed to yield better correction results in shorter times than did traditional methods of image enhancement. He proposed a three-stage approach. First, any obvious problems with color are corrected. Second, contrast is enhanced without changing the color of the first step. Third, more pleasing color is incorporated, usually in LAB. The proposal suggested replacing the traditional method of color correction, where one step is intended to solve color and contrast problems simultaneously. The new workflow was set out in detail, with accompanying video presentations, in his 2013 book Modern Photoshop Color Workflow.

In 2020, Margulis released a new translation, with substantial supporting material and graphics, of the classic 1839 text On the Law of Simultaneous Contrast of Colors by M.E. Chevreul.

In 2001, Margulis was one of the first three members, and the only writer, inducted into the Photoshop Hall of Fame. He was the 2023 recipient of the Progress Award, the highest honor given by the Photographic Society of America, recognizing “a person who has made an outstanding contribution to the progress of photography or an allied subject.”

In the United States, his small-group, hands-on courses in these subjects were sponsored by Sterling Ledet & Associates, Inc. In Europe, he has taught in German, Italian, Spanish and English.

== Bibliography ==
- 2020 On the Law of Simultaneous Contrast of Colors, ISBN 978-0-988-28081-6
- 2015 Photoshop LAB Color Second Edition: The Canyon Conundrum and Other Adventures in the Most Powerful Colorspace, ISBN 978-0-134-17610-9
- 2013 Modern Photoshop Color Workflow: The Quartertone Quandary, the PPW, and Other Ideas for Speedy Image Enhancement, ISBN 978-0-988-28080-9
- 2006 Professional Photoshop Fifth Edition: The Classic Guide to Color Correction, ISBN 0-321-44017-X
- 2005 Photoshop LAB Color: The Canyon Conundrum and Other Adventures in the Most Powerful Colorspace, ISBN 0-321-35678-0
- 2002 Professional Photoshop Fourth Edition: The Classic Guide to Color Correction, ISBN 0-321-44017-X
- 2000 Professional Photoshop 6: The Classic Guide to Color Correction, ISBN 0-471-40399-7
- 1998 Professional Photoshop 5: The Classic Guide to Color Correction, ISBN 0-471-32308-X
- 1996 Makeready: A Prepress Resource, ISBN 1-55828-508-3
- 1994 Professional Photoshop: Color Correction, Retouching, and Image Manipulation With Adobe Photoshop, ISBN 0-471-01873-2
