= Chubb illusion =

Optical illusion

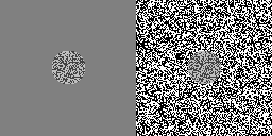
Figure 1: An example of the Chubb illusion. The center areas of two rectangular fields are identical, but appear different because the background fields are different.

The Chubb illusion is an optical illusion or error in visual perception in which the apparent contrast of an object varies substantially to most viewers depending on its relative contrast to the field on which it is displayed. These visual illusions are of particular interest to researchers because they may provide valuable insights in regard to the workings of human visual systems.

An object of low-contrast visual texture surrounded by a field of uniform visual texture appears to have higher contrast than when presented on a field of high-contrast texture. This illusion was observed by Charles Chubb and colleagues and published in 1989. An empirical explanation of the Chubb illusion was published by Lotto and Purves in 2001.

== Discovery ==
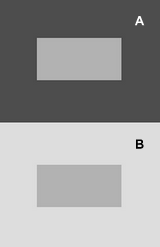
Figure 2: Illustration of simultaneous contrast

Chubb and his colleagues researched this illusion by showing various combinations of foreground objects and background fields to human test subjects and asking them to rate the sharpness of the visual contrast in each foreground object. They found that subjects viewing a patch of random visual texture embedded in a surrounding background field were likely to report different perceptions of visual contrast for the central target patch depending on the relative contrast of the background field. Furthermore, the apparent brightness/dullness of a texture patch varied as the background varied. E.g. bright points of texture patch appeared duller in a high-contrast background, whereas dark points appeared lighter in an even background. This apparent variance in perception is influenced when it is viewed by different observers and when the background and central target patch are placed on "non-overlapping spatial frequency bands", as explained by Chubb et al. This tendency was found statistically significant. Theories point to a perceptual tool to catalyse contrast adaptation (slow, seconds) to contrast gain control (fast,≈100ms) at an early cortical or pre-cortical 'neural locus'.

== Chubb contrast effect ==
The Chubb illusion is similar to another visual illusion, the contrast effect. The contrast effect is an illusion in which the perceived brightness or luminance of an identical central visual target form on a larger uniform background varies to the test subject depending on the ratio of the central form's luminance to that of its background. This illusion, simultaneous contrast, is illustrated in Figure 2. In it, the central target is brighter. I.e., the ratio of the top central rectangle's luminance (A) to its background field's luminance is greater than one. In the bottom rectangle (B), the background field is brighter. That is, the ratio is less than one. Although the two central target patches are equally bright (identical in luminance) the one on a dark background appears lighter and the one on a lighter background appears darker.

== Lateral inhibition ==
Lateral inhibition is one proposal to explain the contrast illusion or simultaneous contrast. Its advocates theorize that neurons strongly stimulated by the background of B suppress the less strongly stimulated neurons of the interior rectangle. In A, they theorize, there is no such inhibition. However, the fact that both A and B appear of "uniform lightness across their expanse" suggests that the process of lateral inhibition is more complex. Chubb et al. assert that the principle of lateral inhibition rests on the assumption that the determining factor of perceived lightness is the ratio, at the rectangle edge, of rectangle luminance to background luminance. However, the lateral inhibition account is not consistent with phenomena such as the Benary cross and White's illusion as well as transparency and assimilation effects. As such, it is an ad hoc explanation of unclear theoretical interest.

The Chubb illusion illustrates an error in contrast rather than luminance. The zero-luminance background of Figure 2 (A) becomes a zero-contrast field in the analogous portion of Figure 1, while the high-luminance field of Figure 2 (B) becomes a high-contrast texture field. Observers empirically perceive the texture disk of the leftmost portion of Figure 1 as having higher contrast than the disk on the right, even though the two are the same. After conducting experiments on contrast and lightness induction, interocular induction and induction between spatial frequency bands, they show that lateral inhibitory effect is monocular and adapted only for spatial frequency. Chubb et al. support "a model in which the output gain of such a band-selective neuron is normalized relative to the average response amplitude of nearby neurons with the same frequency tuning."

== Imperfect transmittance ==
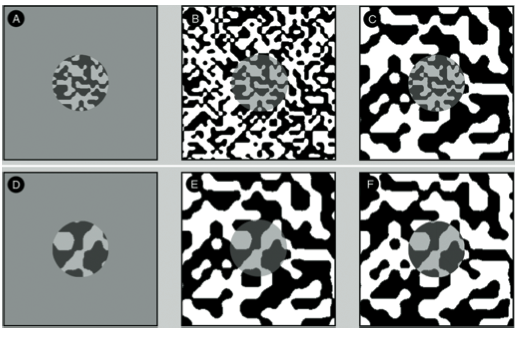
Figure 3: The Chubb Illusion

Visual perceptions are dependent on the interaction of the human visual system with any bi-stable or multi-stable stimuli and the frequency of its occurrence. The lighting of objects at a point, the reflectance of those objects and the transmittance of media between the object and observer is central to determining the primary factors that affect our visual perception. It is due to this that a low contrast image is perceived to be of a higher contrast when placed in front of a grey background. The grey background is more ambiguous than the high contrast background. Lotto and Purves (2001) demonstrated that the Chubb illusion can be explained "by the degree to which imperfect transmittance is likely to have affected the light that reaches the eye." Indeed, these observations suggest a wholly empirical explanation of the Chubb illusion.

Chubb effect estimates that when an object is viewed through an imperfectly transmitting medium, it increases or decreases the apparent brightness or dullness of the target patch, even when luminance ratios and spatial frequencies remain the same. Lotto and Purves (2001) doubted that illusory perceptions of brightness were explained as consequences of lateral inhibition. If that were the case, the perceived difference in brightness of target elements, illustrated in Figure 3 (A), would be largely unaffected by the surrounding field in Figure 3 (C), which exhibits lower spatial contrast than the target, which matches the observations. Despite this, they asserted, "this reasoning is undermined by the fact that the apparent contrast by the target pattern in Figure 3 (D) is mostly unaffected by the surround of Figure 3 (F)." Therefore, they chose to examine the Chubb illusion in 'wholly empirical' terms, as mainly a consequence of past experience, or in this case, the influence of transmittance on ambiguous stimuli.

The common denominator of the Lotto and Purves observations is the explanatory power of imperfect transmittance. Imperfect transmittance causes observers to experience a reduced difference in spectral contrast or luminance from object surfaces. This is because imperfections in the transmission medium produce, such as atmospheric effects distort transmittance. For instance, transmittance varies when viewing objects from a distance, in smog or fog, or through fabric, glass or water. These conditions greatly effect the amount of light that reaches the eye. This hypothesis was tested by altering the probable contributions of imperfect transmittance by manipulating motion, luminance and colour information. In some cases, the relative luminance of two target surfaces can be reduced, as Lotto and Purves demonstrate, from a ratio of 8:3 to approximately 7:5. If perception is generated empirically, then "the extent that a stimulus is consistent with imperfect transmittance...will be incorporated into the perception of the target."

Appropriate behavioural response depends on the evaluation of the relative contributions of illumination, reflectance and transmittance to the visual stimuli. Visual perceptions of contrast are affected by the effects of imperfect transmittance rather than the luminance of the object. The Chubb stimulus illustrated in Figure 1 (B) is consistent with transmittance distortions for two reasons: the patterned elements of the background are continuous with the patterned elements of the target and the luminances of the target elements accord with the values that would arise if the background pattern were viewed through an imperfectly transmitting medium.

The transmittance explanation of the Chubb illusion asserts that changing the stimulus in Figure 1 (B) in a way that makes it less consistent with viewing through an imperfect medium should decrease, or reverse, the illusion. Trials confirm this hypothesis. This explanation throws into doubt the hypothesis that implies that altering luminance, motion, or spectral distribution of the field surrounding the target would not alter perception.

The empirical findings also contradict the hypothesis that 'illusions of brightness' caused by contour junctions in the stimulus explain the Chubb illusion, as proposed by Anderson (1997).

== Chubb illusions in predicting schizophrenia ==
Visual illusions can be categorised into physiological/pathological, perceptual and ambiguous (bistable/multistable). A deviation from the natural perception of objects (stimulus) encourages evaluation of the theories of perception. Visual perception in schizophrenia is distinguished by reduced contextual adjustments and a more accurate perception of the stimulus in tasks involving 'spatial contextual effects'. According to Eunice et al., "contextual illusions arise from vision's adaptive propensity to emphasize relative differences among features rather than their absolute characteristics." While the presence of a high-contrast background reduces the apparent contrast of smaller foreground features in healthy individuals, schizophrenic patients are more accurate in perceiving the contrast between the background and foreground. In order to test this, Keane et al. measured the performance of 15 participants with chronic schizophrenia, 13 psychiatric participants- including individuals with personality and bipolar disorders and 20 non-psychiatric healthy individuals. They were presented with a small isolated target patch or a small patch with a high contrast background, followed by a remote reference patch. The individuals were then asked to note which patch they thought was higher in contrast based on their observations.

The schizophrenic group's immunity to contrast illusion was exceptional, with 12 out of 15 accurate judgements while healthy participants showed severe misperceptions of the centre stimuli. This shows that individuals with schizophrenia are able to perceive 'absolute characteristics' of 'individual features' more accurately. While contextual modulations with regard to luminance, size and orientation were similar between groups, weak contextual modulations correlate with worse symptoms and social functioning.

Visual defects in schizophrenia can lead to cognitive and social problems. Findings of enhanced performance help us ascertain the latent visual abnormalities. Indeed, there has been a rapid growth in the use of contextual visual tasks (Chubb illusions) in clinical testing and NIH-supported studies of schizophrenia. (Gold et al., 2012).

== Old age ==
There is a reduction of the cortical inhibitory function within the ageing visual system, both in humans and animals. This reduction in inhibition accounts for a reduced orientation and direction tuning of aged visual neurons. L. R. Betts et al. (2005) demonstrated that older people were able to distinguish the motion of high-contrast stimuli quicker than younger adults, and that inhibition was responsible for differences in spatial suppression. Karas and McKendrick (2009) used the Chubb illusion to test whether high contrast backgrounds affected the visual perceptions of older participants lesser than the younger participants owing to reduced inhibition. The stimuli used for the experiments were based on the parameters used by Dakin, Carlin and Hemsley (2005), who used the Chubb illusion to check for reduced inhibition in people with schizophrenia. Their study however, showed that contrast sensitivity did not really decline with ageing as the older participants showed a greater discrepancy in perceived contrast of the target with regard to the background than the younger participants.

== See also ==
- Contrast effect
- Checker shadow illusion
- Spatial frequency
