= Chevreul's salt =

- Chevreul's salt

Names
- IUPAC name Copper(I, II) sulfite dihydrate
- Other names Chevreul's salt

Identifiers
CAS Number	13814-81–8 dihydrate; 15293-86-4 anhydrous
3D model (JSmol)	Interactive image
ChemSpider	32699368 dihydrate; 154599 anhydrous
PubChem CID	44148673 dihydrate; 177582 anhydrous
UNII	D8UCX23711 dihydrate; 4IVM1X62DM anhydrous
CompTox Dashboard (EPA)	DTXSID90929993
- InChI: InChI=1S/3Cu.2H2O3S.2H2O/c;;;2*1-4(2)3;;/h;;;2*(H2,1,2,3);2*1H2/q2*+1;+2;;;;/p-4 Key: IJBZIISYIRGDFM-UHFFFAOYSA-J
- SMILES: O.O.[O-]S(=O)[O-].[O-]S(=O)[O-].[Cu+].[Cu+].[Cu+2]

Properties
Chemical formula	Cu_{2}SO_{3}·CuSO_{3}·2H_{2}O
Molar mass	386.78 g·mol^{−1}
Appearance	brick red powder
Density	3.57 g/cm^{3}
Solubility	aqueous ammonia
Magnetic susceptibility (χ)	3.71×10^{−6} emu/g
Thermal conductivity	0.1 kW/(cm·K)

Structure
Crystal structure	monoclinic
Space group	P2_{1}/n
Lattice constant	a = 5.5671 Å, b = 7.7875 Å, c = 8.3635 Å α = 90°, β = 91.279°, γ = 90°
Lattice volume (V)	362.5 Å^{3}

Thermochemistry
Heat capacity (C)	0.62 J·cm^{-3}·K^{-1}
- Except where otherwise noted, data are given for materials in their standard state (at 25 °C [77 °F], 100 kPa). Infobox references

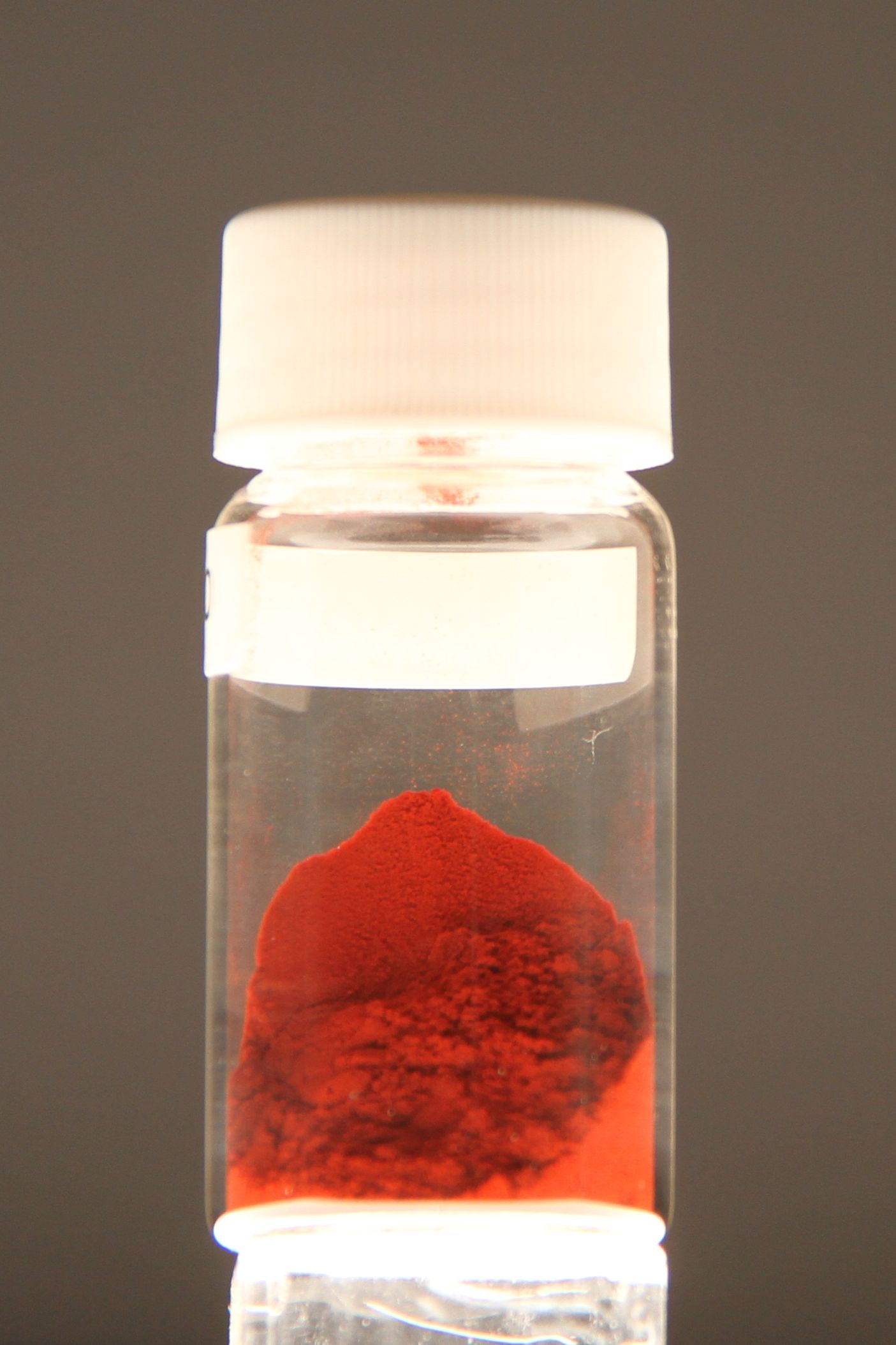
Chevreul's salt in a vial

Chevreul's salt (copper(I,II) sulfite dihydrate, Cu_{2}SO_{3}·CuSO_{3}·2H_{2}O or Cu_{3}(SO_{3})_{2}·2H_{2}O), is a copper salt which was prepared for the first time by a French chemist Michel Eugène Chevreul in 1812. Its unusual property is that it contains copper in both of its common oxidation states, making it a mixed-valence complex. It is insoluble in water and stable in air. What was known as Rogojski's salt is a mixture of Chevreul's salt and metallic copper.

== Properties ==
The infrared spectrum of Chevreul's salt contains strong bands with maxima at 473, 632 cm^{−1}, medium ones at 915, 980, and 1025 cm^{−1}, and a weak band at 860 cm^{−1}. The band at 980 cm^{−1} is due to symmetric stretch of the sulfite group, 632 cm^{−1} is due to symmetric bend, 915 cm^{−1} is due to asymmetric stretch, and 473 cm^{−1} is due to asymmetric bend. The absence of splitting in these bands indicates that the sulfite group is not distorted by the other components in the compound.

The optical reflectance spectrum shows absorption around 425 nm with a shoulder to 500 nm. This is due to a cuprous sulfite chromophore. An absorption peaking at 785 nm with a shoulder to 1000 nm, in the near infrared, is due to Jahn-Teller splitting in cupric ions. Maximum reflectance is around 650 nm in the red part of the spectrum.

In the infrared range the band gap is 0.85 eV.

Chevreul's salt is a representative member of an isomorphic series of double salts with formulae Cu_{2}SO_{3}·FeSO_{3}·2H_{2}O, Cu_{2}SO_{3}·MnSO_{3}·2H_{2}O, and Cu_{2}SO_{3}·CdSO_{3}·2H_{2}O. The properties of these salts show the effect of ionic radius and ion hardness. Another analogue, Cu_{2}SO_{3}·NiSO_{3}·2H_{2}O, is brick-red in colour. It is made by bubbling sulfur dioxide through a nickel sulfate, copper sulfate mixed solution, heating to 80 °C (176 °F) and changing pH to 3.5 to precipitate the salt.

In Chevreul's salt crystals there are two environments for copper. The +1 oxidation state copper is in a distorted tetrahedral space surrounded by three oxygens and a sulfur atom. The +2 oxidation state copper (or other metal in the isomorphic series) is in a distorted octahedral coordination surrounded by four oxygen atoms and two water molecules.

The X-ray photoelectron spectrum of Chevreul's salt shows peaks at 955.6, 935.8, 953.3 and 943.9 eV that correspond to Cu(II) 2p_{1/2}, 2p_{3/2}, Cu(I) 2p_{1/2}, 2p_{3/2}. There are also secondary peaks for copper at 963.7, and 943.9 eV. Sulfur 2p causes a peak at 166.7 eV and oxygen 1s causes a spike at 531.8 eV.

== Preparation ==
Chevreul's salt is prepared by treating aqueous copper(II) sulfate (CuSO_{4}) with a solution of potassium metabisulfite (K_{2}S_{2}O_{5}). The solution changes colour from blue to green immediately. The identity of the green species is unknown. Heating this solution produces a reddish solid precipitate:

3 CuSO_{4} + 4 K_{2}S_{2}O_{5} + 3 H_{2}O → Cu_{3}(SO_{3})_{2}·2H_{2}O + 4 K_{2}SO_{4} + 4 SO_{2} + H_{2}SO_{4}

It has also been prepared by heating a solution of CuSO_{4} with sodium hydrogen sulfite (NaHSO_{3}) at 60–70 °C (140–158 °F) for 3 hours, and by saturating a solution of CuSO_{4} with sulfur dioxide (SO_{2}) at ambient temperature.

When sodium ions are present in the solutions that form the salt, sodium can substitute for some of the copper(I), as the ions have the same charge and similar sizes.

== Reactions ==
Chevreul's salt exhibits properties of both copper(I) and copper(II). Hydrochloric acid produces a white solid of copper(I) chloride. If too much acid is added, the precipitate dissolves. If an ammonia solution is added to the product, it is dissolved and a deep blue color appears - the presence of [Cu(NH_{3})_{4}]^{2+} complex.

On heating in an inert atmosphere it is stable to 200 °C (392 °F). It gives off water and sulfur dioxide to give CuSO_{4}·Cu_{2}O and CuSO_{4}·2CuO. At 850 °C (1,560 °F) cupric oxide (CuO) is formed and from 900 to 1,100 °C (1,650 to 2,010 °F) cuprous oxide (Cu_{2}O) appears. Heating in air or oxygen yields cupric sulfate (CuSO_{4}), cupric sulfite (CuSO_{3}), and ultimately CuO

== Application ==
Chevreul's salt is used in a hydrometallurgical process to extract copper from ore. Firstly the ore is oxidised, then extracted with an ammonium sulfate-ammonia solution. This is then injected with sulfur dioxide resulting in the precipitation of Chevreul's salt. pH must be between 2 and 4.5 for the precipitation to take place.

Chevreul's salt is formed as a corrosion product on copper metal in the presence of humid air contaminated with sulfur dioxide. When first formed the salt has an unstable orthorhombic form with a = 5.591 Å, b = 7.781 Å and c = 8.356 Å, which changes to the normal monoclinic form over a month, or faster when heated.
