= Vivian O'Brien =

American applied mathematician and physicist (1924–2010)

Vivian "Vob" O'Brien (1924 – December 24, 2010) was an American applied mathematician and physicist whose research included fluid dynamics and visual perception. She worked for many years as a researcher at Johns Hopkins University, and is the namesake of the Craik–O'Brien–Cornsweet illusion.

== Education and career ==
O'Brien was originally from Baltimore, and was educated at Eastern High School (Baltimore) and then Goucher College, where she earned a bachelor's degree in mathematics in 1945. Because of World War II, technical jobs were open to women at the time, and she began working in aerodynamics as a computer for the Glenn L. Martin Company. She became a research assistant in aerodynamics at Johns Hopkins University in 1947, and while doing so earned two master's degrees, in mathematics in 1950 and in engineering aeronautics in 1954.

In 1955 she became a principal staff physicist at the Eisenhower Research Center of the Johns Hopkins Applied Physics Laboratory, a position she kept for over 30 years until her retirement in 1986. She completed a Ph.D. in fluid mechanics in 1960, becoming the first female employee of the Applied Physics Laboratory with a doctorate.

== Research ==
O'Brien's research included aerodynamics, magnetohydrodynamics, fluid dynamics, the flow of blood through the human eye, and visual perception. She is the namesake of the Craik–O'Brien–Cornsweet illusion in the optical perception of brightness.

== Recognition ==
O'Brien was named a Fellow of the American Physical Society (APS) in 1976, following a nomination by the APS Division of Fluid Dynamics.
