= Grid illusion =

Kind of grid that deceives a person's vision

An example of the Hermann grid illusion. Dark blobs appear at the intersections.

A grid illusion is any kind of grid that deceives a person's vision. The two most common types of grid illusions are the Hermann grid illusion and the scintillating grid illusion.

== Hermann grid illusion ==
The Hermann grid illusion is an optical illusion reported by Ludimar Hermann in 1870. The illusion is characterized by "ghostlike" grey blobs perceived at the intersections of a white (or light-colored) grid on a black background. The grey blobs disappear when looking directly at an intersection.

== Scintillating grid illusion ==
An example of the scintillating grid illusion. Dark dots seem to appear and disappear at intersections.

The scintillating grid illusion is an optical illusion, discovered by E. and B. Lingelbach and M. Schrauf in 1994. It is often considered a variation of the Hermann grid illusion but possesses different properties.

It is constructed by superimposing white discs on the intersections of orthogonal gray bars on a black background. Dark dots seem to appear and disappear rapidly at random intersections, hence the label "scintillating". When a person keeps their eyes directly on a single intersection, the dark dot does not appear. The dark dots disappear if one is too close to or too far from the image.

== Differences between the scintillating and Hermann grid illusions ==
The difference between the Scintillating Grid Illusion and the Hermann Grid Illusion is that the former has dots already in place at the intersections, which is not the case for the latter. Since, at first sight, the graphs appear similar, the two illusions are occasionally confused. But the scintillating illusion does not occur with an isolated intersection, as is the case for the Hermann grid; observations suggest that a minimum of 3 × 3 evenly spaced intersections with superimposed discs are required to produce the effect. This requirement suggests the participation of global processes of the kind proposed for the linking and grouping of features in an image, in addition to local processes.

== Theories ==
The effect of both optical illusions is often explained by a neural process called lateral inhibition. The intensity at a point in the visual system is not simply the result of a single receptor, but the result of a group of receptors which respond to the presentation of stimuli in what is called a receptive field.

A retinal ganglion cell pools the inputs of several photoreceptors over an area of the retina; the area in physical space to which the photoreceptors respond is the ganglion cell's "receptive field". In the center of a so-called on-center receptive field, the individual photoreceptors excite the ganglion cell when they detect increased luminance; the photoreceptors in the surrounding area inhibit the ganglion cell. Thus, since a point at an intersection is surrounded by more areas of intensity than a point at the middle of a line, the intersection appears darker due to the increased inhibition.

There is strong evidence that the retinal ganglion cell theory is untenable. For example, making the lines of the grid wavy rather than straight eliminates both the Hermann grid and scintillating grid illusions. The Baumgartner / RGC theory does not predict this outcome. Lateral inhibition theory also can not account for the fact that the Hermann grid illusion is perceived over a range of bar widths. Lateral inhibition theory would predict that decreasing the size of the grid (and therefore decreasing the amount of inhibition at the intersection) would eradicate the illusory effect. One alternative explanation is that the illusion is due to S1 type simple cells in the visual cortex.

== See also ==
- Spatial summation
- Cornsweet illusion
- Lateral inhibition
- Mach bands
