= Ludimar Hermann =

German physiologist and speech scientist

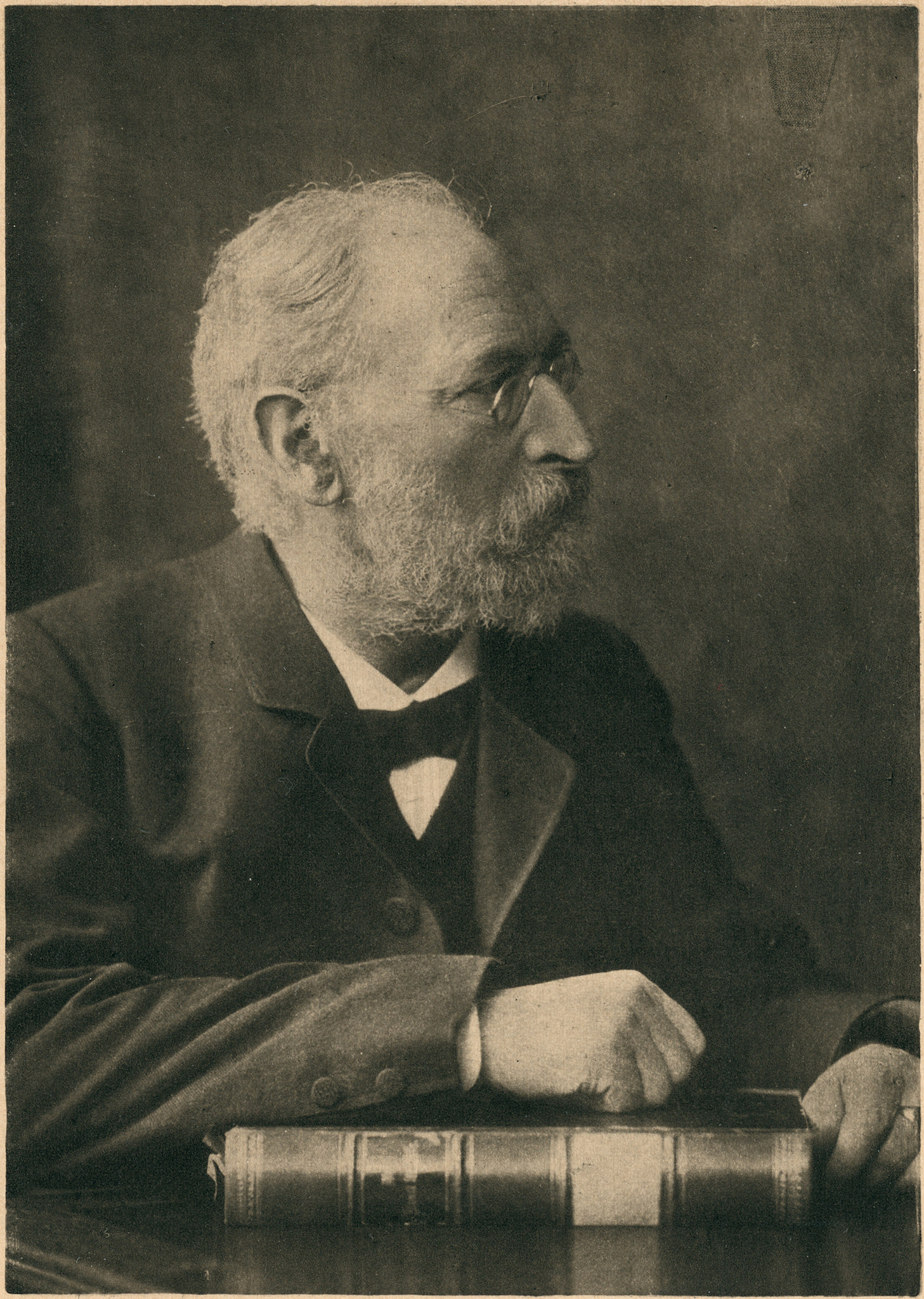
Ludimar Hermann (1838–1914)

Ludimar Hermann (October 31, 1838 – June 5, 1914) was a German physiologist and speech scientist who used the Edison phonograph to test theories of vowel production, particularly those of Robert Willis and Charles Wheatstone. He coined the word formant, a term of importance in modern acoustic phonetics. The Hermann grid is named after him; he was the first to report the illusion in scientific literature.

== Physiology research ==
Hermann was born in Berlin. In addition to his work in phonetics, he was influential as a physiologist. He opposed the notion, propounded by Emil du Bois-Reymond, that muscles contained an ordered series of "electromotive molecules" in favor of a theory of chemical activity. Hermann showed that the entire surface of an uninjured muscle was electrically equipotential. His discoveries in this field were instrumental to the modern use of the electrocardiograph as a diagnostic tool. He also was the first to explain the digestive process as being a decomposition of protein through acid hydrolysis to obtain the raw materials needed by cells.

Hermann died in Königsberg. An obituarist credited his research success to "his exceptional skill in the design, construction, and use of apparatus as needed for the problems on which he was engaged. Most of these problems depended for their solution on the accurate measurement of physical quantities."

Hermann is probably best remembered as the editor of a textbook on physiology.

== Phonetics research ==
In his analysis of voice and speech, he made use of photographic registration and magnification of the surface features of a phonograph record's grooves to visually display the sounds of speech. Through his work, he determined that the passage of air through the mouth cavity, modified for each vowel, strongly affected the harmonics of tones from the larynx.
