= Checker shadow illusion =

Optical illusion

The regions marked A and B are the same shade of gray.

A region of the same shade has been drawn connecting A and B.

The checker shadow illusion is an optical illusion published by Edward H. Adelson, professor of vision science at MIT, in 1995. It demonstrates the context-dependent nature of human color perception.

== Description ==
The illusion deconstructed

The image depicts a checkerboard with light and dark squares, partly shadowed by another object. The optical illusion is that the area labeled A appears to be a darker color than the area labeled B. However, within the context of the two-dimensional image, they are of identical brightness, i.e., they would be printed with identical mixtures of ink, or displayed on a screen with pixels of identical color.

== Related illusions ==
While Adelson's checker shadow illusion is one of the best-known contrast illusions, there are similar effects which cause two regions of identical color to appear differently depending on context:

- The Cornsweet illusion creates a boundary between two identically-shaded regions with a discontinuous gradient, resulting in the opposing sides appearing to be different.
- The Chubb illusion evokes this effect by surrounding zones with others of different, distinct shades, with the relative brightness or darkness of the surrounded area appearing different.
- An illusion closely related to the checker shadow illusion, which also relies on using implied visual shadows to seemingly darken a brighter region to the same color as a well-lit dark region, involves two squares placed at an angle, with the darker square being lit and the lighter square at an angle which receives poor light.

== See also ==
- Color constancy
- Psychophysics
- The dress
