= Mach bands =

Optical illusion

Exaggerated contrast between edges of the slightly differing shades of gray appears as soon as they touch

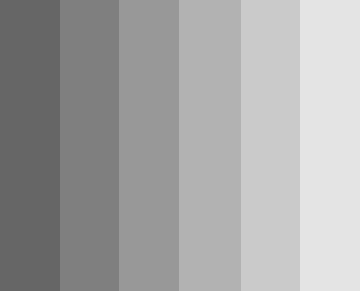
Along the boundary between adjacent shades of grey in the Mach bands illusion, lateral inhibition makes the darker area falsely appear even darker and the lighter area falsely appear even lighter.

Mach bands is an optical illusion named after the physicist Ernst Mach. It exaggerates the contrast between edges of the slightly differing shades of gray, as soon as they contact one another, by triggering edge-detection in the human visual system. The Mach band illusion is sometimes called the Chevreul illusion.

== Explanation ==
The Mach bands effect is due to the spatial high-boost filtering performed by the human visual system on the luminance channel of the image captured by the retina. Mach reported the effect in 1865, conjecturing that filtering is performed in the retina itself, by lateral inhibition among its neurons. This conjecture is supported by observations on other (non-visual) senses, as pointed out by Georg von Békésy. The visual pattern is often found on curved surfaces subject to a particular, naturally occurring illumination, so the occurrence of filtering can be explained as the result of learnt image statistics. The effect of filtering can be modeled as a convolution between a trapezoidal function that describes the illumination and one or more bandpass filters. A tight approximation is obtained by a model employing 9 even-symmetric filters scaled at octave intervals.

The effect is independent of the orientation of the boundary.

== In radiology ==
An illusory cross (×) appears in the large image due to gradient discontinuity

This visual phenomenon is important to keep in mind when evaluating dental radiographs for evidence of decay, in which grayscale images of teeth and bone are analyzed for abnormal variances of density. A false-positive radiological diagnosis of dental caries can easily arise if the practitioner does not take into account the likelihood of this illusion. Mach bands manifest adjacent to metal restorations or appliances and the boundary between enamel and dentin. Mach bands may also result in the misdiagnosis of horizontal root fractures because of the differing radiographic intensities of tooth and bone.

Mach effect can also lead to an erroneous diagnosis of pneumothorax by creating a dark line at the lung periphery (whereas a true pneumothorax will have a white pleural line).

== In computer graphics ==
Example of Mach bands at the ends of gradients where the derivative of the luminance is discontinuous: 1. Actual luminance profile; 2. Perceived luminance profile; 3. Smooth luminance profile for comparison

Mach bands can also appear when there is a discontinuity in the derivative of a gradient, a visual effect common when intensities are linearly interpolated such as in Gouraud shading.

Computer image processing systems use edge-detection in a way analogous to the brain, using unsharp masking to clarify edges in photos for example.

== See also ==
- Acutance
- Cornsweet illusion
- Hermann grid illusion
- Lateral inhibition
- Optical illusions
- Watercolour illusion
- Gibbs phenomenon
