= Tom Cornsweet =

American experimental psychologist (1929–2017)

Tom N. Cornsweet
- Born: April 29, 1929; Cleveland, Ohio
- Died: November 11, 2017 (aged 88); Prescott, Arizona
- Education: Cornell University, Brown University
- Known for: Cornsweet illusion
- Scientific career
- Fields: Ophthalmology, psychology
- Workplaces: Yale University (1955–1959), University of California, Berkeley, Stanford Research Institute, Stanford University, Baylor College of Medicine, University of California, Irvine, Brien Holden Vision Diagnostics

Tom Norman Cornsweet (April 29, 1929 – November 11, 2017) was an American experimental psychologist known for his pioneering work in visual perception, especially the effect that bears his name, and in the development of ophthalmic instrumentation.

== Academic background and scientific research ==
Cornsweet is known for documenting the effect that bears his name in the 1960s. Prior to his work on this particular optical illusion, Cornsweet graduated from Cornell University and enrolled in a graduate program at Brown University, operating in the vision research laboratory of Lorrin A. Riggs. During his graduate studies he was co-author of an early paper describing stabilized images. His 1955 Ph.D. dissertation in experimental psychology involved small movements of the eye. Cornsweet was an assistant professor at Yale University from 1955 to 1959, and then became professor of psychology at the University of California, Berkeley. His interest in psychophysics led him to develop a widely employed improvement in the staircase method. As an outgrowth of the courses he taught, Cornsweet published a frequently-cited textbook.

== Inventor and entrepreneur ==
In the late 1960s and early 1970s, Cornsweet was a key member of the Bioinformation Systems Group at the Stanford Research Institute (SRI). While also teaching in the psychology department at Stanford University, he designed or co-designed several innovative instruments for measuring properties of the eye, including eyetrackers, auto-refractors, and optical fundus scanners.

He left SRI to become Chief Scientist at Acuity Systems of Reston Virginia, where he developed the first commercial auto-refractor in 1973. It gave the objective reading of the refractive index of the eye in one second, saving practitioners up to 15 minutes a patient. That saved an average Ophthalmologist more than an hour a day resulting in a huge increase in productivity and income.

Acuity Systems introduced the world's first Auto-refractor. They sold approximately 3000 of them worldwide between 1975 and 1979 before selling ownership to Simmons Instruments Inc. Many copies followed. They were made by Coherent Radiation of California, Nidek of Japan and others. All versions of the Auto-refractor sold are estimated to total $15bn as the instrument is now universally commonplace in the Optometrist and Ophthalmologist workplaces. The Auto-refractor saved sight in many cases.

One of many such instances occurred in Sydney Australia when a severely myopic patient, blind because the closest his expert optometrist could come to prescribing spectacles was 5.75 diopter sphere, 3.75 diopter cylinder at an incorrect angle, and the Auto-refractor immediately six times indicated a prescription of 15.75D sphere x 5.75D cylinder at 108 degrees. The patient was seen leaving the practise and heard proclaiming "I can see, I can see!"

Multiple thousands of such instances occurred worldwide. A device to measure the refractive index of spectacle lenses, the Auto-lensmeter was also a commercial success in parallel with the Auto-refractor.

In the 1980s Tom Cornsweet developed a number of devices including one which measured the density of cataracts, ESA, the Eye System Analyser, which in a 30-second eye test determined presence of diseases of the nervous or muscular system such as multiple sclerosis 15 years before its noticeable onset, clinical signs of Hodgkin's lymphoma, and many other diseases.

An industrial version, named the FIT2000, was first used with coal miners in Queensland Australia and later in Chile resulting in huge safety gains in the workplace. The FIT2000 detected that up to 5% of the workforce were impaired by sleep deprivation, illegal drug use, excessive use of prescription medications, or alcohol abuse. A daily 36-second eye test was administered for ten days to establish a baseline. Comparison to the baseline values allowed detection of illegal drug use, alcohol abuse, lack of sleep, and indicated when a medical referral was indicated for a differential diagnosis of narcolepsy, brain diseases, and brain damage. The FIT2000 has also been used by militaries worldwide to determine the level fatigue of pilots and soldiers who have experienced severe sleep deprivation as a result of several days of continuous military activities.

Cornsweet continued to invent devices for measuring various properties of the eye and also to teach, first at the Baylor College of Medicine and later at the University of California, Irvine. He served as Vice President of research and development for Sensory Technologies from 1994 to 1997. In 1999 Cornsweet retired from UC–Irvine and co-founded Visual Pathways, where his team developed an automated retinal imaging system intended for the diagnoses of glaucoma, cataracts, diabetic retinopathy and macular degeneration.

Visual Pathways folded into the Brien Holden Vision Institute after several years and successfully installing 24 breakthrough 3D fundus cameras, where from 2013 to 2015, Tom Cornsweet was Chief Scientist at Brien Holden Vision Diagnostics (formerly Quantum Catch), a company developing very low-cost ophthalmic 3D fundus cameras and instruments for detection and monitoring of eye, brain and muscle disease primarily and principally for 3rd world countries which could not afford available instrumentation.

Until his death in 2017, Cornsweet was Professor of Cognitive Science, Electrical and Computer Engineering, and Ophthalmology, emeritus, University of California, Irvine.

== Patents and awards ==
- 40 patents, primarily in the area of optical and ophthalmic instrumentation
- UC Berkeley Distinguished Teaching award 1961
- Charles F. Prentice Medal Award from the American Academy of Optometry, 1984

== Publications ==
Cornsweet wrote three books and published more than 100 journal articles.

Books

- The Design of Electric Circuits in the Behavioral Sciences. John Wiley & Sons. 1963.
- Visual Perception. Academic Press. 1970.
- Why is Everything!: Doing Science
- Seeing. How light tells us about the world. University of California press. 2017

Journal articles

- Riggs, L.A.; Ratliff, F.; Cornsweet, J.C.; Cornsweet, T.N. (1953). "The disappearance of steadily fixated test objects". Journal of the Optical Society of America. 43 (6): 495–501. doi:10.1364/josa.43.000495. PMID 13070111. S2CID 18242090.
- Johnson, E.P.; Cornsweet, T.N. (1954). "Electroretinal photopic sensitivity curves". Nature. 174 (4430): 614–615. Bibcode:1954Natur.174..614J. doi:10.1038/174614b0. PMID 13203594. S2CID 4294116.
- Cornsweet, T.N. (1956). "Determination of the stimuli for involuntary drifts and saccadic eye movements". Journal of the Optical Society of America. 46 (11): 987–993. Bibcode:1956JOSA...46..987C. doi:10.1364/josa.46.000987. PMID 13367941. S2CID 13288941.
- T.N. Cornsweet. PhD Thesis Publication No. 13, 163. University Microfilms, Library of Congress #MICA 55–1914.
- Stark, L.; Cornsweet, T.N. (1958). "Testing a servoanalytic hypothesis for pupil oscillations". Science. 127 (3298): 588. Bibcode:1958Sci...127..588S. doi:10.1126/science.127.3298.588. PMID 13529021. S2CID 39025274.
- Cornsweet, T.N.; Fowler, H.; Rabedeau, R.G.; Whalen, R.E.; Williams, D.R. (1958). "Changes in the perceived color of very bright stimuli". Science. 128 (3329): 898–899. Bibcode:1958Sci...128..898C. doi:10.1126/science.128.3329.898. PMID 13592271. S2CID 45265340.
- Cornsweet, T.N. (1958). "New technique for the measurement of small eye movements". Journal of the Optical Society of America. 48 (11): 808–811. Bibcode:1958JOSA...48..808C. doi:10.1364/josa.48.000808. PMID 13588456.
- Krauskopf, J.; Cornsweet, T.N.; Riggs, L.A. (1960). "Analysis of eye movements during monocular and bionocular fixation". Journal of the Optical Society of America. 50 (6): 572–578. doi:10.1364/josa.50.000572. PMID 14411808.
- Cornsweet, T.N. (1962). "The staircase method in psychophysics". Am. J. Psychol. 75 (3): 485–491. doi:10.2307/1419876. JSTOR 1419876.
- Cornsweet, T.N. (1962). "A stabilized image requiring no attachments to the eye". Am. J. Psychol. 75 (4): 653–656. doi:10.2307/1420292. JSTOR 1420292. PMID 14023109. S2CID 210393532.
- Cornsweet, T.N. (1962). "Changes in the appearance of stimuli of very high luminance". Psychol. Rev. 69 (4): 257–273. doi:10.1037/h0048381. PMID 13881415. S2CID 18528333.
- T.N. Cornsweet. "Measuring movements of the retinal image with respect to the retina". In: Biomedical Sciences Instrumentation, Volume 2, Plenum Press. (1964)
- Cornsweet, T.N.; Pinsker, H. (1964). "Luminance discrimination of brief flashes". J. Physiol. 176 (2): 294–310. doi:10.1113/jphysiol.1965.sp007551. PMC 1357195. PMID 14286356.
- Cornsweet, T.N.; Teller, D.Y. (1965). "Relation of increment thresholds to brightness and luminance". Journal of the Optical Society of America. 55 (10): 1303–1308. Bibcode:1965JOSA...55.1303C. doi:10.1364/josa.55.001303. PMID 5888119. S2CID 45106746.
- T.N. Cornsweet. Stabilized image techniques. National Academy of Sciences Symposium, "Recent developments in vision research." (1966)
- Cornsweet, T.N.; Crane, H.D. (1970). "Servo-controlled infrared optometer". Journal of the Optical Society of America. 60 (4): 548–54. Bibcode:1970JOSA...60..548C. doi:10.1364/JOSA.60.000548. PMID 5440853. S2CID 45184855.
- Crane, H.D.; Cornsweet, T.N. (1970). "Ocular focus stimulator". Journal of the Optical Society of America. 60 (4): 577. doi:10.1364/josa.60.000577. S2CID 120071433.
- Cornsweet, T.N.; Crane, H.D. (1973). "Training the visual accommodation system". Vision Research. 13 (3): 713–715. doi:10.1016/0042-6989(73)90034-5. PMID 4693413.
- Cornsweet, T.N.; Crane, H.D. (1973). "Accurate two-dimensional eye tracker using first and fourth Purkinje images". Journal of the Optical Society of America. 63 (8): 921–929. Bibcode:1973JOSA...63..921C. doi:10.1364/josa.63.000921. PMID 4722578. S2CID 14866408.
- T.N. Cornsweet. The Purkinje-image method of recording eye position. In: Eye movements and psychological processes, Monty and Senders, eds., Lawrence Earlbaum Associates, Inc. (1976)
- T.N. Cornsweet. The Bezold-Brucke effect and its complement, hue constancy. In: Visual Psychophysics: The physiological foundations. Academic Press. (1978)
- T.N. Cornsweet, S. Hersh, R. Beesmer, and D. Cornsweet. Quantification of the shape and color of the optic nerve head. In: Advances in diagnostic visual optics. Breinin and Siegal, eds, Springer-Verlag. (1983)
- Cornsweet, T.N. (1983). "Image processing in the retina". Journal of the Optical Society of America. 73 (12): 1944. doi:10.1364/JOSA.73.001852.
- Mikelberg, F.S.; Douglass, G.R.; Schilzer, M.; Cornsweet, T.N.; Wigsman, K. (1984). "Reliability of optic disk topographical measurements recorded by the Rodenstock Video-Optograph". Am. J. Ophthalmol. 98 (1): 98–102. doi:10.1016/0002-9394(84)90194-6. PMID 6742084. S2CID 13507635.
- J.I. Yellott, B.A. Wandell, and T. N. Cornsweet. The beginnings of visual perception. In: Handbook of Physiology, Vol. III, The nervous system. Darian Smith, ed. The American Physiological Society. (1984)
- Cornsweet, T.N. (1985). "A simple retinal mechanism that has profound effects on perception". Optometry and Vision Science. 62 (7): 427–438. doi:10.1097/00006324-198507000-00001.
- Cornsweet, T.N.; Yellott, J.I. (1985). "Intensity-dependent spatial summation". Journal of the Optical Society of America. 2 (10): 1769–1786. Bibcode:1985JOSAA...2.1769C. doi:10.1364/josaa.2.001769. PMID 4056951. S2CID 26346161.
- T.N. Cornsweet. Understanding the swinging flashlight test. In: Non-invasive assessment of the visual system, Volume 1, Optical Society of America Technical Digest series. (1993)

List of publications adapted from Cornsweet's curriculum vitae, published by the University of California, Berkeley.
