= Aesthetic illusion =

Type of mental absorption

Aesthetic illusion is a type of mental absorption which describes a generally pleasurable cognitive state that is frequently triggered by various media or other artifacts. Recipients can be drawn into a represented world imaginatively, emotionally or, to some extent, rationally and experience the world, the characters and the story in a lifelike way. The emergence of aesthetic illusion depends heavily on an authored vision provided by a (media) artifact. Thus, different recipients can be expected to share similar imaginative experiences, which stands in contrast to more recipient-centered illusionist experiences like hallucinations, dreams, daydreams and delusions. Aesthetic illusion (immersion) is always counterbalanced by a rational awareness of the recipient of the difference between the "real" and the "imagined". In other words, aesthetic illusion is a double-layered phenomenon in which recipients constantly fluctuate between their "virtual" body on the level of immersion (primarily imaginatively and emotionally) and their "real" body on the level of rational awareness and distancing effect.

Illusionist media or artifacts can either be

- fictional (e.g. the Harry Potter series) or factual (e.g. historiographic narratives, travelogues)
- aesthetic (i.e. widely considered "works of art") or non-aesthetic (e.g. works in popular culture, new media and artifacts that would not (yet) readily be called art)
- narrative (i.e. telling a story) or descriptive (e.g. many landscape paintings or still lifes).

== History of the term and the concept ==
The term illusion derives from the Latin word illudere ("to mock", "to deceive"; from in- [against] and ludere [to play]) and alludes to a certain playfulness and the willing participation in a game on the part of the recipient. Kendall Walton speaks in this context of illusion as a game of make-believe. Aesthetic derives from the Ancient Greek αἰσθητικός ("of sense perception"). In the context of aesthetic illusion, aesthetic does not refer to a specific or high aesthetic quality of an artifact; instead, it refers to the etymological meaning of "sensory" as well as to an aesthetic effect, i.e. to a specific imaginative reaction of the recipients which is triggered by an artifact.

The term aesthetic illusion is primarily, though not consistently, used in the academic fields of literature and the visual arts. Other terms used in these fields to describe the same or a similar phenomenon include absorption (Nell 1988), make-believe, recentering (Ryan 1991) and immersion (e.g. Ryan 2015). Academic literature in other fields, such as film studies, game studies, or psychology, tends to prefer other terms—immersion in particular (e.g. Ermi & Märyä, 2005; Thon, 2008).

Especially the realm of (digital) technology appears to be driven by a desire to achieve a higher degree of aesthetic illusion (cf. Wolf, 2014, Chapter 3.5), where terms such as immersion, immersive, absorbing, addicting and addictive are frequently used to describe a state of high mental or sensory absorption. The usage of these terms, however, runs the risk of promoting a one-sided or incomplete view of aesthetic illusion whenever no references are made to the opposite pole of rational awareness (distance) or when the sole focus is on (hyper-)realistic (re)presentation. These alternative terms may even point to different phenomena like flow or (tele‑)presence altogether.

The first known occurrence of the concept of aesthetic illusion was traced back by Ernst Gombrich (1960) to the visual arts of the period between the 6th and 4th century B.C. Some scholars, however, find first traces in even older works such as Homer's epics. Later, both Plato and Aristotle argued over the value of mimesis in the sense of the representation of nature (which is an important part of aesthetic illusion).

Discussing Shakespeare’s tragedy Anthony and Cleopatra, Samuel Johnson alluded to the concept in his preface to his 1765 edition of collected plays of Shakespeare:

He that can take the stage at one time for the palace of the Ptolemies, may take it in half an hour for the promontory of Actium. Delusion, if delusion be admitted, has no certain limitation; if the spectator can be once persuaded, that his old acquaintance are Alexander and Cæsar, that a room illuminated with candles is the plain of Pharsalia, or the bank of Granicus, he is in a state of elevation above the reach of reason, or of truth, and from the heights of empyrean poetry, may despise the circumscriptions of terrestrial nature. There is no reason why a mind thus wandering in extacy should count the clock, or why an hour should not be a century in that calenture of the brains that can make the stage a field.

The truth is, that the spectators are always in their senses, and know, from the first act to the last, that the stage is only a stage, and that the players are only players. They came to hear a certain number of lines recited with just gesture and elegant modulation. The lines relate to some action, and an action must be in some place; but the different actions that complete a story may be in places very remote from each other; and where is the absurdity of allowing that space to represent first Athens, and then Sicily, which was always known to be neither Sicily nor Athens, but a modern theatre?

Kant speaks of a similar phenomenon when he discusses his transcendental illusion in his Kritik der reinen Vernunft (Critique of Pure Reason) (cf. McFarland 1990, p. 346f.). In 1817, Samuel Taylor Coleridge famously defined aesthetic illusion as the "willing suspension of disbelief".

More recently, the concept has been revisited and examined by several academics, including philosopher Kendall Walton in his make-believe theory, literary scholar Marie-Laure Ryan in a number of articles and books (e.g. 1991, 2015), Emeritus Professor of Psychology Victor Nell (1988) and numerous scholars in the field of game studies, though usually with a strong emphasis on immersion (see Cairns, Cox, & Nordin, 2014 for a review on research on immersion in video games). English literature professor Werner Wolf developed a comprehensive theory of aesthetic illusion and provides a definition that encompasses various media, genres and modes of reception (cf. 2013, 2014).

== Examples ==
The elements described below can contribute to the emergence of aesthetic illusion in the recipient’s head, especially if they are skillfully blended with each other. However, this will only ever hold true so long as the context permits an illusionist experience (e.g. the reception process is not hindered by interruptions or the lack of attention) and the recipient has the basic skills and (cultural, conventional, …) knowledge to engage with the (media) artifact in a meaningful way and willingly suspends his or her disbelief towards its inherent artificiality.

=== Novel: Thomas Hardy – Tess of the d'Urbervilles (1891) ===
Tess of the d’Urbervilles displays many highly illusionist qualities, which is typical of realist fiction. The novel presents a primarily believable and highly detailed account of rural people and rural life at the end of the 19th century and is situated in Hardy’s semi-fictional Wessex. This is exemplified by the first paragraph of the first chapter in the novel:

On an evening in the latter part of May a middle-aged man was walking homeward from Shaston to the village of Marlott, in the adjoining Vale of Blakemore, or Blackmoor. The pair of legs that carried him were rickety and there was a bias in his gait which inclined him somewhat to the left of a straight line. He occasionally gave a smart nod, as if in confirmation of some opinion, though he was not thinking of anything in particular. An empty egg-basket was slung upon his arm, the nap of his hat was ruffled, a patch being quite worn away at its brim where his thumb came in taking it off. Presently he was met by an elderly parson astride on a gray mare, who, as he rode, hummed a wandering tune.

This first paragraph is dense in information. Hardy provides not only a detailed and “embodied” description of the appearance and motions of the two men, but also roots the story in his version of Wessex (which, regardless of being an outmoded region, provides a consistent and believable fiction of authenticity; the novel even came with a map of the region). The first paragraph also provides an alternative spelling of Blakemore, which is the first of many subtle pieces of information scattered across the novel with the goal to create an illusion of historical (and later also hereditary and other types of) authenticity. Hardy uses all of these pieces of information to imaginatively draw his readers into his novel and create and embellish a specific image in their heads by maintaining a high level of verisimilitude (“life-likeness”).

Other illusionist and thus immersive qualities of the novel are, for example, its serious mode of writing (for the comical would require a certain unwanted rational distance in the reader in this case), a clear focus of the novel on the story-level while almost no attention is explicitly drawn to its form, a plot that is comparatively easy to follow and understand and that is highly consistent.

=== Video game: Nintendo – The Legend of Zelda: Breath of the Wild (2017) ===
Breath of the Wild is an interactive video game and an exemplary exercise in illusory worldmaking as it presents players with an extensive world that feels rooted in (fictional) history, is rich in diversity and which provides every player with the opportunity to uniquely interact with a consistent, believable and complex virtual world.

While clearly not realistic, Breath of the Wild has been lauded for its visually appealing and credibly and consistently realized rendition of Hyrule, the game world, which warmly invites players to go and explore every corner of its vast game world. Hyrule consists of many different biomes, sights, dungeons, villages, ruins and other stunningly beautiful landmarks for the players to discover and explore. Furthermore, the order in which the game's many regions are explored (or not explored) is almost completely up to the players. This sense of agency likely further immerses them into the game world. Players will also uncover the histories of different areas as told by the buildings, objects and the land itself and they will come across many stories as told by the NPCs that populate the whole game world. Importantly, while every element has the potential to immerse players, it is when they are believably interwoven with each other that they create a convincing, consistent and continual impression of Hyrule as an actual “living and breathing” place. For example, jumping or falling off from a high elevation point leads to injury or death and activities like running, climbing and swimming drain the stamina of Link, who is the character the players embody in the game. On the other hand, the stamina bar and other user interface elements in the game may contribute to increasing the rational awareness and hence distance of the players towards the inherent artificiality of the game.

The game world can be interacted with in many ways, too. For example, boulders and other objects behave in a physically believable way (e.g. when rolling down a slope), wooden and dry objects can catch fire, trees can be felled and arrows shot take a downwards trajectory due to gravity. The forces of nature as depicted in the game, while comparatively simplistic, also greatly contribute to the impression of world consistency and verisimilitude. For example, the game simulates different times of day and different weather, Link shivers or starts freezing when it is cold and sweats or begins to overheat in hotter areas, fire creates an updraft which players can exploit by using the paraglider to reach a higher elevation, wind influences speed and movement while paragliding, Link will be hit by lightning when he has any metallic gear equipped and a thunderstorm is raging at the same time and he can generally climb almost any cliffsides and buildings (but rain makes surfaces too slippery to climb unless Link is below ledges or under a roof). These and other game mechanics and their visual representations help establish aesthetic illusion in the players’ minds.
