= Brien Holden Vision Institute =

Australian nonprofit organization

BHVI
- Formation: 1985
- Type: NGO
- Headquarters: Sydney, Australia
- CEO: Yvette Waddell
- Website: bhvi.org
- Formerly called: Institute for Eye Research

The Brien Holden Vision Institute (BHVI) is an Australian nonprofit non-governmental organization with an international focus on eye care research and vision care delivery. Formerly the Institute for Eye Research, in 2010, it was renamed in recognition of co-founder and optometrist Professor Brien Holden OAM (d. 2015), a 1997 recipient of the Medal of the Order of Australia for his contributions to eye care research.

== Research and development ==
BHVI develops and partners with commercial and nonprofit organizations worldwide to accomplish its goals. Its activities include the development of vision correction products (including eyeglasses, contact lenses and surgical devices) for the treatment of myopia (near-sightedness), presbyopia (also known as "aging sight"), hyperopia and astigmatism. It also conducts research in improvements in contact lens technology, treatments for conditions such as dry eye and technologies to detect eye disease and other eye related conditions.

== Global activities ==
Brien Holden Vision Institute (BHVI) is headquartered in Sydney and has been represented in New South Wales and the Northern Territories of Australia, Cambodia, China, Colombia, India, Malawi, Mongolia, Nigeria, Pakistan, Papua New Guinea, South Africa, Sri Lanka, Tanzania, Uganda and Vietnam. Worldwide, BHVI has developed over 400 eye care sites and, since 1998, provided optometric services to more than 2.5 million people. It has reached 57 schools and trained nearly 50,000 eye care personnel. It was one of two principal investigators in the 2012 study, "The global cost of correcting vision impairment from uncorrected refractive error", with findings published in the Bulletin of the World Health Organization.

=== Africa ===
In Africa, BHVI sponsored the African Vision Research Institute at the University of KwaZulu-Natal in Durban, South Africa, which conducts research on disease control, human resource development, infrastructure development, provides training in research methods, and promotes publication of research findings for postgraduate students. Additional collaborative work includes vision care in Kenya, Uganda and Tanzania, projected to reach four million children. In 2014, BHVI partnered with Standard Chartered and SightSavers to provide paediatric eye surgeries at no cost to children aged 15 and younger in Uganda, as part of the Seeing is Believing Child Eye Health project. Also in 2014, BHVI stressed the need for access to affordable spectacles in Tanzania in order to help eliminate vision impairments. The organization partnered with the Tanzanian Optometric Association to distribute spectacles and offer free "professional development courses" for optometrists.

=== China ===
Researchers at the Zhongsan Ophthalmic Centre at Sun Yat-Sen University in Guangzhou, China, are working in 2013 with BHVI on juvenile myopia on a project focused on myopia clinical translational research. Myopia, which affects up to 600 million Chinese people, is a target of research at the Australia China Centre for Optometry Research and Development, which BHVI established in 2012.

=== India ===
In 2011, BHVI co-founded the India Vision Institute, headquartered in Hyderabad, India.

=== Pakistan ===
In 2014, a six-day workshop called Low Vision Assessment and Peadtric Refraction provided training and inventory to refractionists from Pakistani district headquarters hospitals, the College of Ophthalmology (COAVS) and Layton Rahmatulla Benevolent Trust hospitals . It was led by the South Asia regional manager of BHVI and the program manager of BHVI Pakistan. This marked the first time in Pakistan that ten district headquarters hospitals were equipped to operate low-vision centers.

== Australian government support ==
BHVI was an essential participant in Vision CRC Ltd, which was established in 2003 under the Australian Government's Cooperative Research Centres Program.

The Australian government's National Health and Medical Research Council lists BHVI as an Approved Administering Institution. The Australian International Development's NGO Cooperation Program helped to fund BHVI in a partnership with Lurio University in Mozambique, to develop and implement a comprehensive program for optometry services in Mozambique and for Portuguese-speaking African countries. BHVI has full membership in the anti-poverty organization Australian Council for International Development and is a full participant in "Vision 2020 Australia", which is part of a global initiative of the World Health Organization and the International Agency for the Prevention of Blindness.

== Brien Holden Vision companies ==
BHVI has sponsored the establishment of commercial entities known as Brien Holden Vision subsidiary companies in Australia, China, India and the United States to directly bring to market advanced products of benefit to consumers and to generate revenues to fund research, education, development and humanitarian activities.

BHVI is developing instruments for diagnosis of eye disorders and in 2012 took a controlling share in the United States company, Quantum Catch, renamed Brien Holden Vision Diagnostics, a company focused on the design, manufacture and sale of affordable, high-quality diagnostic medical devices.
