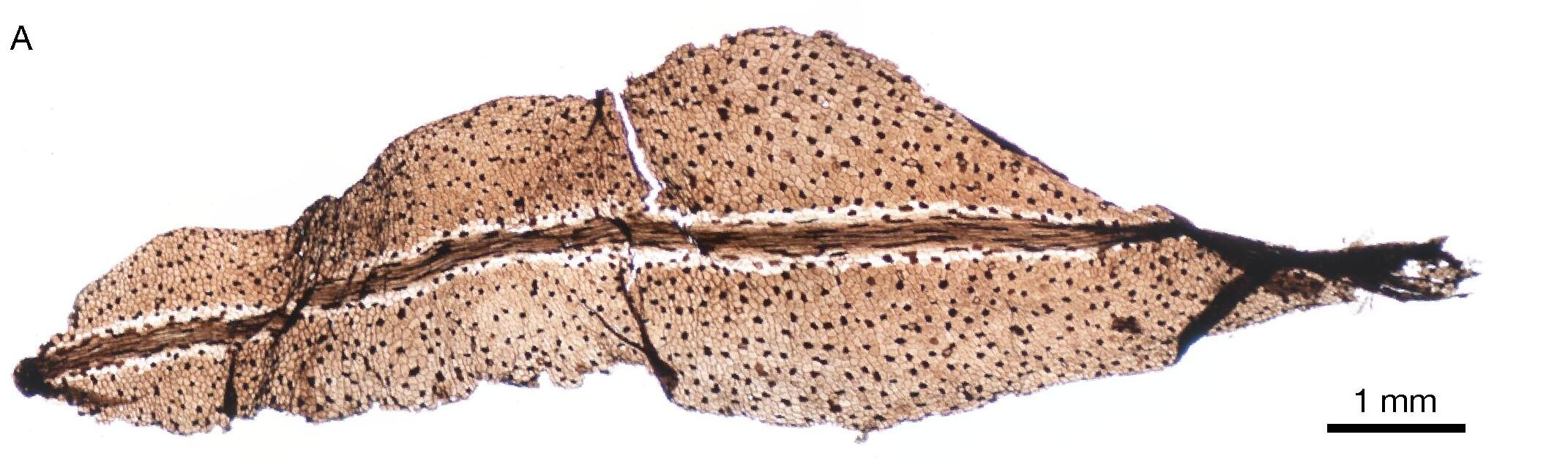
- Light micrograph of a thallus

Scientific classification
- Kingdom: Plantae
- Division: Marchantiophyta
- Class: Jungermanniopsida
- Order: Metzgeriales
- Genus: †Metzgeriothallus; Walton, 1928

Species
- M. metzgerioides Walton, 1928 (type); M. sharonae VanAller Hernick et al., 2008

= Metzgeriothallus =

Metzgeriothallus Temporal range: Givetian–Lower Mississippian

Extinct genus of liverworts

Metzgeriothallus sharonae is the oldest known liverwort fossil, dating to the Middle Devonian. It is a simple, thalloid organism. M. metzgerioides is known from more fragmentary material dating to the Carboniferous of Scotland. A defining feature of these fossils is the presence of dark, scattered cells that closely resemble oil body cells of modern liverworts, suggesting evolutionary homology and implicating these structures in the chemical defense of liverworts against arthropod herbivory. Dark cells are distributed more or less evenly throughout the thallus wings, often forming characteristic 'salt-and-pepper' patterns, a spatial arrangement associated with the phenomenon of lateral inhibition.
