= Cornsweet illusion =

Optical illusion

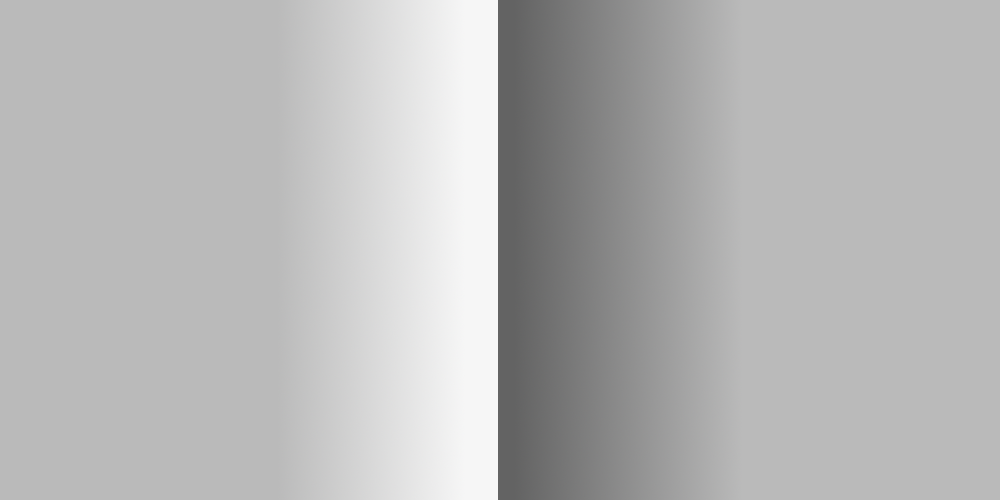
In an example of the Cornsweet illusion, the whole left half of this rectangle seems to be lighter than the right. In fact they have the same brightness, apart from the gradients in the center.

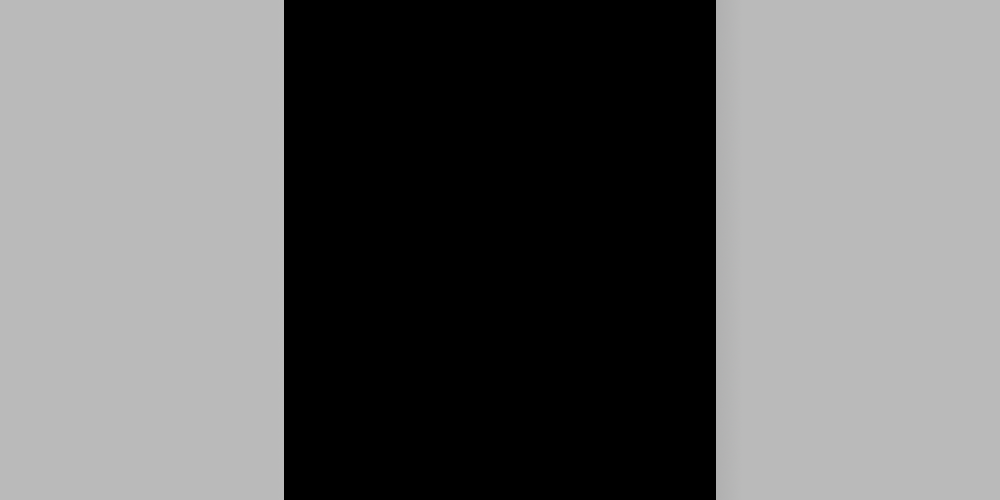
The same image as above, but the edge in the middle is hidden: the left and right part of the image appear as the same brightness.

The Cornsweet illusion, also known as the Craik–O'Brien–Cornsweet illusion or the Craik–Cornsweet illusion, is an optical illusion that was described in detail by Tom Cornsweet in the late 1960s. Kenneth Craik and Vivian O'Brien had made earlier observations in a similar vein.

The original version of the illusion involved a rapidly spinning black-and-white disk, painted in a way that would create the appearance of a gradient effect when in motion. An equivalent static version of illusion is composed of a gray rectangle where the left half fades to a lighter shade as it approaches a vertical center line, and the right half fades to a darker gray approaching the same line. As a result, the whole left half of the rectangle appears lighter than the right half, but in fact the brightness of both areas is exactly the same. This can be seen by blacking out the region containing the edge.

This phenomenon is similar to the phenomenon of simultaneous contrast and Mach bands, but differs from it in two important respects.

- In Mach bands, the effect is seen only on areas that are close to the intensity gradient. In the Craik–O'Brien–Cornsweet illusion, a very small area (the central "edge") affects the perception of entire large areas, portions of which are distant from the edge.
- In the Cornsweet illusion, the region adjacent to the light part of the edge appears lighter, and the region adjacent to the dark part of the edge appears darker, just the opposite of the usual contrast effects.

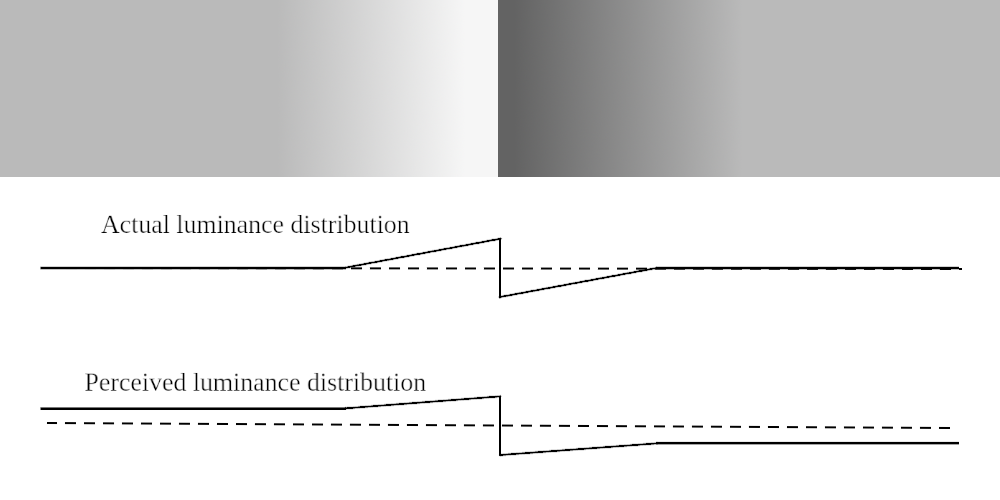
The actual distribution of luminance in the picture, and the typical perception of luminance.

A far more convincing and dramatic version of the effect can be seen in the article by Purves, Lotto, and Nundy, where it is presented within a quasi-realistic image of solid, illuminated objects. These writers give an explanation of this and other illusions, in which the visual system and brain are posited to generate percepts on an empirical basis that is much like a reflex. In their words, "... [perception] accords not with the features of the retinal stimulus or the properties of the underlying objects, but with what the same or similar stimuli have typically signified in the past."
