= Troxler =

Troxler is a surname. Notable people with the surname include:

- Ignaz Paul Vital Troxler (1780–1866), Swiss philosopher
- Steve Troxler (born 1952), American farmer and politician
- Niklaus Troxler, Swiss graphic designer

== See also ==
- Troxler's fading, a phenomenon of visual perception
