= Triplax flavicollis =

Scientific classification
- Kingdom: Animalia
- Phylum: Arthropoda
- Clade: Pancrustacea
- Class: Insecta
- Order: Coleoptera
- Suborder: Polyphaga
- Infraorder: Cucujiformia
- Family: Erotylidae
- Genus: Triplax
- Species: T. flavicollis

Binomial name
- Triplax flavicollis Lacordaire, 1842

Synonyms
- Triplax championi Gorham, 1888; Triplax confinis LeConte, 1854; Triplax flavicollis var. confinis LeConte, 1854; Triplax hoegei Gorham, 1888; Triplax hogei (lapsus); Triplax högei (incorrect original spelling); Triplax mesomelas Gorham, 1888

Species of beetle

Triplax flavicollis is an American species of small pleasing fungus beetle (family Erotylidae). It is placed in subfamily Tritominae (formerly Triplacinae), or – in taxonomic arrangements that prefer a more comprehensive subfamily Erotylinae – in tribe Tritomini of the Erotylinae.

This species is one of the most common members of its family in North America and is one of the "breast-plated" pleasing fungus beetles of the Triplax thoracica cryptic species complex. This large group, other than T.thoracica and T.flavicollis, also includes T.californica, T.cuneata, T.dissimulator, T.errans, T.frosti, T.lacensis, T.mesosternalis, T.microgaster, T.puncticeps and T.wehrlei.

== Description ==
Adults of this beetle are about 2.25-5.2 mm long and 1.15-2.85 mm wide, possibly with a north-south clinal increase in size or even distinct large and small subpopulations. Their elongated elliptical body has smoothly curving sides and is mostly bare, with conspicuous hair only on the abdomen. Like in many of their relatives, head and pronotum are reddish-orange, while the elytra are black and shiny. As usual for the members of the "breast-plated" species complex, T.flavicollis has orange legs and antenna bases and lacks a conspicuous margin to the forehead sides, which also form a well-rounded obtuse angle towards the tip. The "stems" of the antennae are orange to segment 5, while segments 6 and 7 may be orange or brown; from segment 8 onwards, the antennae form a darker "club" – usually blackish, but lighter some Central American specimens. The underside is reddish-orange from the head to the prothorax, and dark brown to black on the abdomen.

Meso- and metathorax of T.flavicollis grade from blackish to orange, with the extent and proportion of orange coloration varying considerably. While much of the variation is individual and random, North American populations are described as having a blackish to dark chestnut-brown meso- and metathorax, while in most Central American T.flavicollis the mesothorax – and the entire thorax except the metathoxax sides in the most extreme examples – is orange. Henry Gorham in his 1888 review established no less than three "new species" based on this individual variation – "Triplax championi", "Triplax hoegei" (= T.hogei, T.högei), and "Triplax mesomelas". The origin of the type specimens is badly documented, and with their male genitalia being identical to typical T.flavicollis, all of Gorham's "species" are nowadays sunk into T.flavicollis.

T.flavicollis can be distinguished from most other Triplax – even very close relatives – by having a distinct margin at the base of the elytra, and a pitch-brown coloration extending from the abdomen onto the thorax. Its presumed closest relatives – T.dissimulator, T.wehrlei and perhaps T.errans differ in having a dark or spotted pronotum except T.wehrlei, which looks much like T.flaxicollis but with an all-orange underside. While Triplax adults generally are very variable in size, T.flavicollis takes individual variation to an extreme – in addition to the usual variation in length, individuals may be notably stouter or slimmer than average, and some – particularly near the Gulf of Mexico coast – have a more rectangular pronotum with flaring sides and a pronounced outward curve not just at the front but also the rear end. Such specimens were described as "Triplax confinis" by John LeConte, but were later revised to be simply individual variants with no taxonomic standing.

Head
The head is elongate-oval and well visible from above; it has small compound eyes with tiny ommatidia, indicating a diurnal or crepuscular lifestyle, but with overall rather little reliance on eyesight; it is very densely sprinkled with largish punctures, which on the head sides near the compound eyes are even larger and denser and almost cover the entire surface. All T.flavicollis adults possess file-like structures at the sides of the neck attachment, which, when the beetle wiggles its head, rub against the chitin and produce a squeaking sound; these structures are developed similarly to those of, e.g., the unrelated pleasing fungus beetle Dacne pubescens. The ocular striae end above the antenna attachments; the epistome, unlike in T.macra and its relatives, lacks a margin along the tip and only has indistinct margins on the straight sides, which curve towards the almost straight tip which has a slight concavity in the center. The "cheek" lobes below the compound eyes are small, with somewhat rounded side edges which diverge to the rear. The length of the 11-segmented antenna is two-thirds of the pronotal base width, with antenna segment 3 shorter than the segments 4 and 5 together. The "stem" of the antenna has sparse short silvery bristles and bears a "clubbed" antenna tip, which consists of the last four segments (8-11) and is more than twice as long as it is wide and not very compact. Unusual for a North American Triplax, the antenna segment 8 is two-thirds as wide as the segment 9, markedly triangular and part of the "club", rather than slender and part of the antenna "stem".

As for the mouthparts, the galea and lacinia of the maxilla resemble those of the related genus Tritoma, the galea being almost triangular, with a tip carrying sparse bristles at the outer side and a dense pack of bristles on the inner side. The lacinia is also covered in dense bristles, and – unlike in Tritoma – at the tip has two small black incurved teeth, set so closely together that they may appear as a single tooth. The maxillary palps curve inwards and have a first segment that is at least as long as segments 2 and 3 together. Their end segment is somewhat triangular, abruptly cut-off, and almost three times as wide as it is long. Along its entire tip, there runs a small brush, which consists of a single row of microscopic fleshy finger-like cylinders, which on their sides have many small bristles. The labium has a mentum that is quite small and narrow, with short and almost parallel sides; however, between individuals, size and shape of the mentum are somewhat variable. The labial palps end in a widened hatchet-shaped segment, which is sparsely covered in short bristles, with a longer strong bristle at the outer side. At its tip, it has a tiny brush, much smaller than that at the end of the maxillary palps, and composed of a single row of short smooth nubs.

Body, wings and legs
The prothorax is almost as wide at the base as the wings at their widest point and narrower at the front, giving it a trapezoidal shape. The pronotum is also trapezoid-shaped, with the rear edge around two-thirds again as long as the forward edge; its sides gently curve at least in front, and in individuals with widened pronotum also in the rear. A thin margin runs around the sides and rear of the pronotum, but is absent from the front between the compound eyes. In each corner of the pronotum, there is a sizeable navel-shaped pore, and the pronotum is loosely covered in moderately-sized shallow punctuations; towards the sides the punctures become slightly larger and denser, but are still separated from each other by their own diameter or more. The sclerites of prosternum, pronotal epipleura, mesosternum, metepisternum and metepimeres are all distinct, and the prosternum and metasternum lack clearly visible lengthwise lines from the center margin of the leg attachments to the rear edge of the prosternum. The abdomen consists of 5 sternites, with the first being the widest; lines between the hindleg attachments run along the base of the abdomen, which protrudes as a narrow bent process between the hindleg attachments.

The scutellum is bluntly pentagonal to almost heart-shaped. The elytra have a distinct margin at the base; they are ornamented with regular impressed lines containing mid-sized punctuations, and staggered rows of very tiny punctures in between these lines, where the elytral surface is also ornamented by microscopic reticulated fissures. The attachments of each leg pair are set narrowly together; the fore- and mid-leg coxae are almost ball-shaped, while those of the hindlegs are wider than long. The trochanters of the hindlegs have a right triangle shape, and the femora are slightly thickened. The tibiae are slightly widened towards the tip (often, but not reliably, a bit wider in males) except on the barely widened forelegs, and have a bluntly rounded upper/outer edge. On the 5-segmented tarsi, segment 4 is reduced, attached to the upper centerside of segment 3, and firmly joined to the base segment 5; segment 3 is straight or almost so on all sides.

The aedeagus of the male genitalia has narrow tegminal arms, down- and forward-curving dorsal struts of the tegmen, and lateral lobes which attach to the tip of the basal piece. The median lobe is slightly curved, with a tipwards membrane at the back surrounding a hole in the center. The internal sac is somewhat shorter than in T.thoracica, extending forward only to the middle of the median strut. It has fairly short lengthwise sclerotized stripes at the rear back, with inner edges that reach downwards around the ejaculatory duct. Like in other members of its species complex, a conspicuous black muscle attachment is located at the forward tip of the internal sac. The ejaculatory duct is fairly short and enclosed in the internal sac; it gradually tapers towards a thin tip which reaches the median foramen. The female genitalia are fairly generic, resembling those of other Erotylidae such as Megalodacne, which within the pleasing fungus beetle family is not particularly closely related to Triplax. But while they are proportionally smaller in width compared to the larger-bodied Megalodacne (just like in all Triplax) except for the larger basal segments of the valvifers and the paraprocts, almost all parts are drastically shortened in length compared to e.g. Triplax macra. However, the styli are sized as in most other Triplax species, and the proctigeral lobe is comparatively oversized, extending up to the valvifer tips. Tergite 8 except for being longer and narrower resembles that of Haematochiton in having strongly sclerotized lines along the sides, and in the centerline near the tip a deep but narrow membranous indentation.

== Distribution ==
The type locality of Triplax flavicollis is simply "North America". There, it occurs across much of the eastern half of the continent, from south of the Great Lakes and northeastern Canada throughout the eastern USA and into Central America. Most of its distribution is east of the 100th meridian west; its westward extension reaches southeastern Manitoba, and runs from there to eastern Texas. Isolated reports exist from elsewhere, such as the Colorado region; it is not certain that all these records are correctly identified and refer to genuine and naturally-established populations.

At its northern limit, it ranges at least to Card Lake near Sherwood, Nova Scotia, Saint-Jean-sur-Richelieu, Quebec and Ottawa, Ontario. Its northwestern extent is little known, but it can be found in Itasca State Park, Minnesota. Westwards, it occurs at least to Brookings amd Elk Point in South Dakota, near the Little Blue River northeast of Ayr and in the Mormon Island State Recreation Area on the South Platte River in Nebraska, in Riley County, Kansas, and San Antonio, Texas.

In Central America, it is comparatively well-attested from central to southwestern Mexico, with specimens from Acatlán de Juárez, Guerrero ("Acahuizlotla") and Morelos ("Cerro de Plumas") states, and from San Blas, Nayarit on the Pacific coast at least up to 1,900 m (6,200 ft) AMSL at Ixtapan de la Sal. Further east, records become more spotty, but it almost certainly occurs at least in the uplands all the way to the Isthmus of Panama: In Guatemala it was collected at a "Finca San Rafael" in Sacatepéquez Department at 2,200 m (7,200 ft), and in El Salvador in La Libertad Department whose highest elevation is San Salvador volcano at about 1,900 m AMSL. In Panama, specimens were collected in Bugaba District, on Barro Colorado Island, and even east of the Panama Canal in or near Paraíso, at most some 100 metres (below 400 ft) AMSL.

== Ecology ==
Adults of T.flavicollis only get active in warmer temperatures, usually May to October; they are most common in summer, mainly July-August, when they are occasionally caught on the wing in flight intercept traps. But even as far north as Saint-Jean-sur-Richelieu, they have been collected in early October. In the south of its range this beetle may be encountered all year round, with specimens having been collected at Lucedale, Mississippi, on a January 28, at Gainesville, Florida, on a February 9, at New Augusta, Mississippi on a February 12, on the Kissimmee River in Florida on a November 21, at Hope, Arkansas, on November 24, and in Austin, Texas, on December 24.

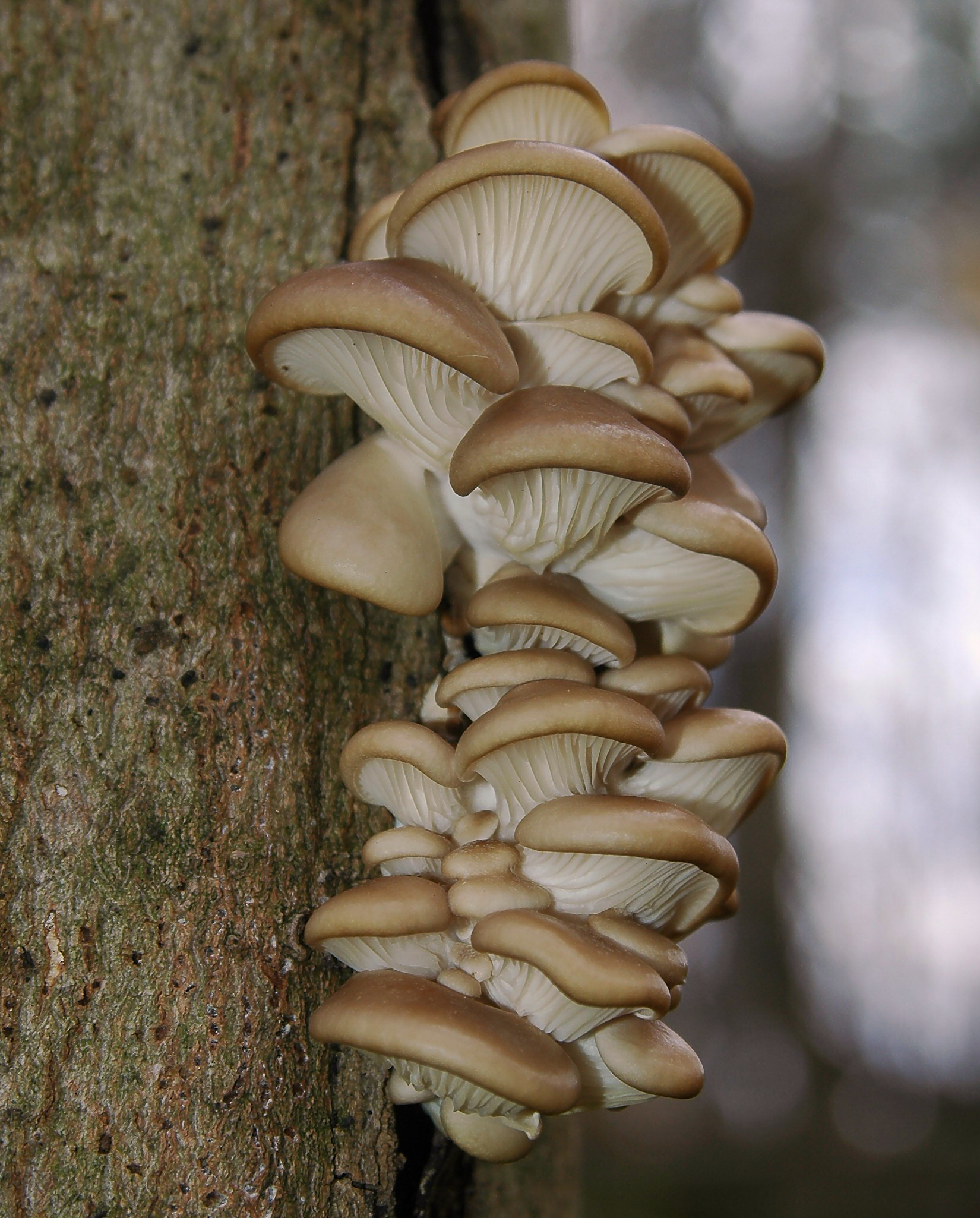
Common oyster mushroom (Pleurotus ostreatus) and its closest relatives are the only known food of T.flavicollis larvae (Westmoreland County, Pennsylvania)

This species was noted to associate with Dacne quadrimaculata, a non-Tritominae/Tritomini pleasing fungus beetle, whereas usually, members of this family keep to their own kind. T.flavicollis is also very often found together with T.thoracica; in this case, it was noted that adults mingle freely, but larvae found with such mixed associations are almost always of one of the two species only. Apparently, the species (whose ecological requirements are all but identical) use some niche partitioning, such as feeding on fresh and moist vs older and drier mushroom bodies, to avoid competition.

Similarly, the specific trees sometimes noted as collection sites of T.flavicollis are sought out by these beetles mostly due to the fungi that parasitize them, as well as for shelter. T.flavicollis was found crawling on the leaves of a peach (Prunus persica) tree in Richmond County, North Carolina, on a May 8, and has also been noted associated with hickory (Carya, formerly Hicoria), red spruce (Picea rubens), poplars and aspens (Populus), and hemlock fir (Tsuga).

The ecology of the larvae has been comparatively well studied. This beetle apparently eats only oyster mushrooms (Pleurotus; Agaricales: Pleurotaceae) as larvae and adults. Specifically, it is monophagous on the common oyster mushroom (Pleurotus ostreatus) in most of its North American range, but in subtropical areas it might utilize other, more heat-tolerant, taxa of "Group I" of the P.ostreatus clade, such as the Florida oyster mushroom P."florida". But among thousands of food records for T.flavicollis, only in one single case was a distinctly different fungus associated with this beetle – "Panus strigosus". This highly ambiguous name has historically been applied to a number of Polyporales regardless of their actual relationship. It most often refers to Lentinus levis or L.strigosus of the Polyporaceae, or to the 1-2 species of Panaceae variously named Panus lecomtei, P.neostrigosus and P.rudis. More likely that a genuine alternate food source of T.flavicollis, either the record is a misidentification, or a mistake on behalf of the beetle – species called "Panus strigosus" are similar in habitus to P.ostreatus, being mid-sized pale brownish shelf fungi with gills below, even though they are not particularly closely related within class Agaricomycetes.
