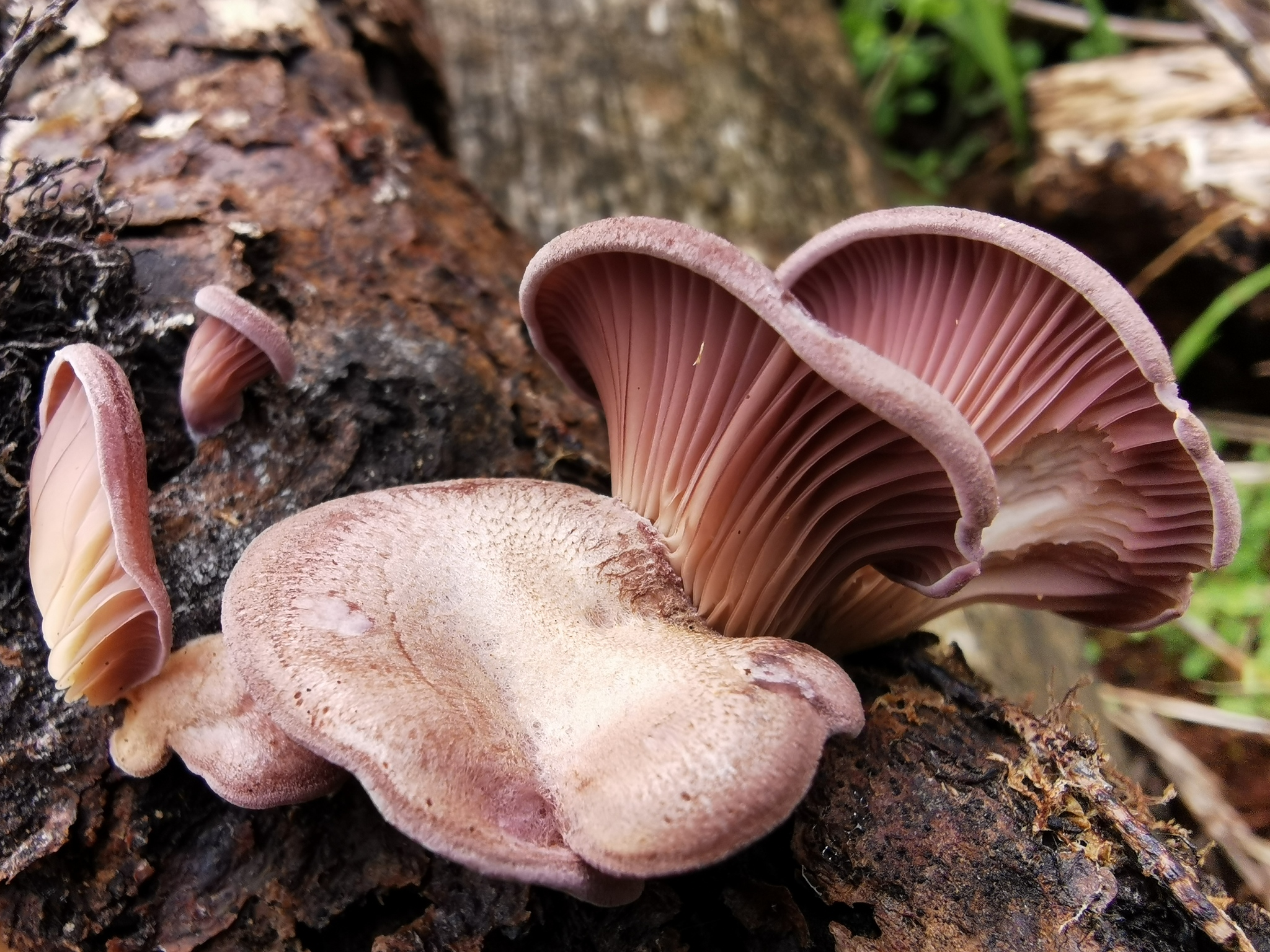

Scientific classification
- Kingdom: Fungi
- Division: Basidiomycota
- Class: Agaricomycetes
- Order: Polyporales
- Family: Panaceae
- Genus: Panus
- Species: P. purpuratus

Binomial name
- Panus purpuratus G.Stev. (1964)

= Panus purpuratus =

Species of fungus

Panus purpuratus is a fungus in the family, Panaceae, first described by Greta Stevenson in 1964. The type species was collected from fallen wood in a coastal forest in Waikanae in 1949. The species is endemic to New Zealand.
