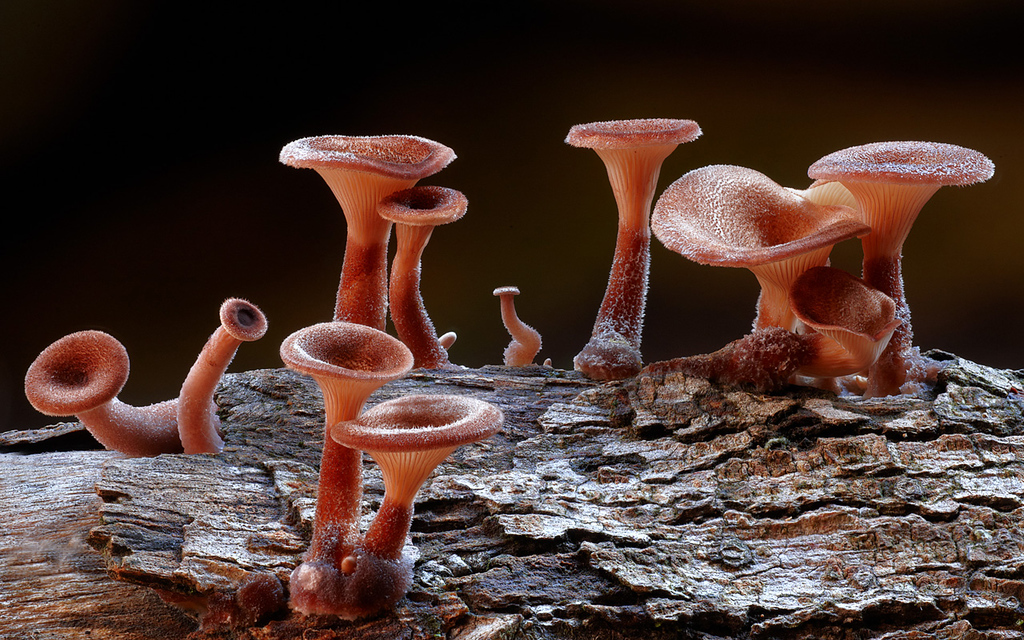

Scientific classification
- Kingdom: Fungi
- Division: Basidiomycota
- Class: Agaricomycetes
- Order: Polyporales
- Family: Panaceae
- Genus: Panus
- Species: P. fasciatus

Binomial name
- Panus fasciatus (Berk.) Pegler
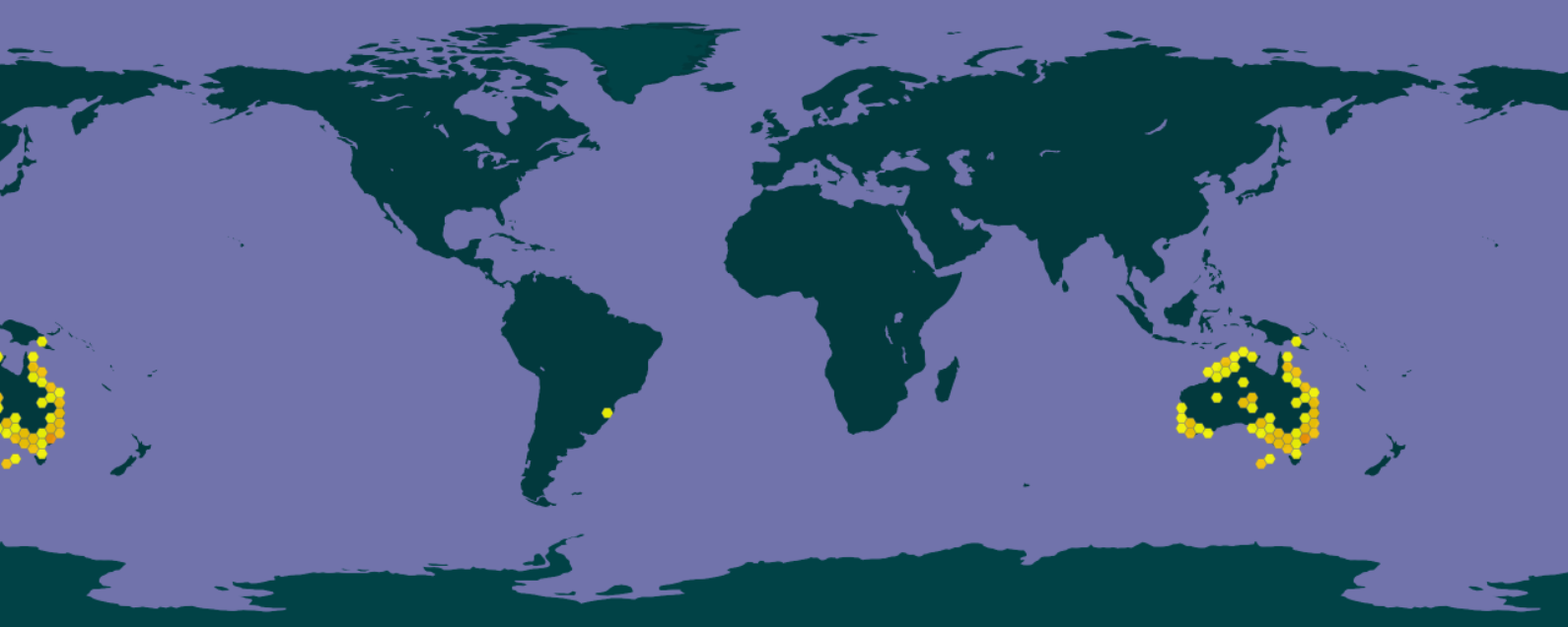
- Species distribution of Panus fasciatus

Synonyms
- Lentinus fasciatus Berk.

= Panus fasciatus =

Species of fungus

Panus fasciatus (common name includes hairy trumpet) is a species of fungus in the family Polyporaceae in the genus Panus of the Basidiomycota. P. fasciatus has a fruiting body in the shape of a funnel with a velvety texture, hence the nickname "hairy trumpet." When it was identified by D. Pegler of Kew, he created a subgroup of the Lentinus fungi, called Panus based on their hyphal systems. For this reason, Panus fasciatus is sometimes referred to as Lentinus fasciatus. Panus fasciatus has been described with numerous other names which were combined by Pegler in 1965.

== Morphology ==
The fungus has a unique shape, with the cap in-rolled when the fungus is young, and then developing a funnel (or infundibuliform) shape over time. It is also known for having pale brown hairs that cover the cap. In dry conditions, the stalk peels like bark but returns to normal following rain. P. fasciatus also has deeply decurrent gills, a velvety pileus, and dense hairs. The fungus can have purple gills that turn brown as they mature. The spores have a white print.

== Reproduction ==
Basidiospores of P. fasciatus reside on the hymenium of the gills of the fruiting body. When two germinating basidiospores of opposite mating types fuse via plasmogamy, the two nuclei remain unfused while a basidiocarp fruiting body is formed. On the gills beneath the cap, numerous basidia are formed. Karyogamy and meiosis occur and give rise to mature basidiospores. These are then released via the Buller's drop method of spore dispersal.

== Ecology ==
Panus fasciatus is a wood-decaying saprotroph that feeds on rotting logs or small branches.

== Habitat ==
Panus fasciatus is commonly found in drier woodland environments, amongst the grass, and beneath eucalypts, acacias, and casuarinas. It is usually exposed to sunlight most of the day.

== Distribution ==
Panus fasciatus has been recorded in southern and eastern Australia, Africa, Cameroon, Oceania, Papua New Guinea, and New Caledonia, however, much of its distribution is unknown. It has been recorded in low numbers in the Jarrah forest region of western Australia.

== Taxonomy ==
The species was originally described by Miles J. Berkeley in 1840 as Lentinus fasciatus. It was later renamed by David Pegler of the Kew Royal Botanical Garden in 1965 in the Australian Journal of Botany. Pegler treated Panus as a subgroup of Lentinus, however another mycologist, Corner, considered Panus and Lentinus as two separate genre based on their hyphal systems, so their relationship is controversial. These subgroups were identified based on morphology, but held true for the most part upon more molecular research. Pegler's identification of P. fasciatus was based on collections from Tasmania gathered by R.C. Dunn and R. W. Lawrence. P. fasciatus was among the first fungal species to be identified in Australia.

Panus fasciatus
- Mycological characteristics
- Gills on hymenium
- Cap is infundibuliform
- Hymenium is decurrent
- Stipe is bare
- Spore print is white
- Ecology is saprotrophic
- Edibility is unknown
