= Watercolor illusion =

Optical illusion in which a white area takes on a pale tint

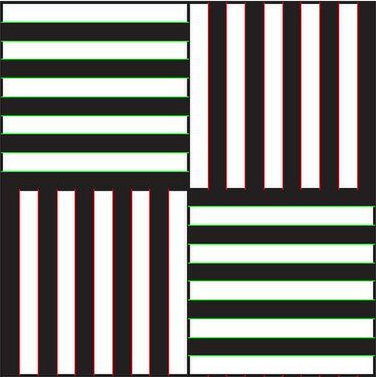
An illustration similar to that used by Broerse, Vladusich, and O’Shea (1999), demonstrating what became known as the watercolor illusion. The vertical gratings are black and white with a thin line of red along each black bar. The horizontal gratings are black and white with a thin line of green along each black bar. The illusion is that the red and green appear to spread over the black and white regions of the vertical and horizontal gratings respectively.

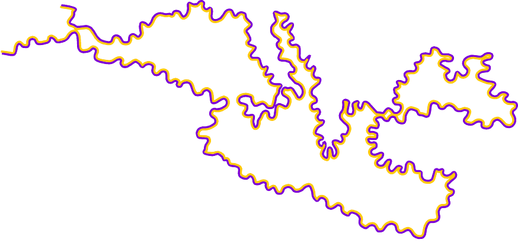
Illustration from Pinna (2008). Purple undulated contours adjacent to orange ones are perceived as a map of the Mediterranean Sea evenly colored by a light veil of orange tint spreading from the orange contours (coloration effect). The shape shows a strong figure-ground segregation and a solid figural appearance comparable to a bas-relief illuminated from the top and to rounded surfaces segregated in depth and extending out from the flat surface (figural effect). On the contrary, the complementary regions appear as empty spaces with the appearance of holes.

The watercolor illusion, also referred to as the water-color effect, is an optical illusion in which a white area takes on a pale tint of a thin, bright, intensely colored polygon surrounding it if the coloured polygon is itself surrounded by a thin, darker border. The inner and outer borders of watercolor illusion objects are often of complementary colours. The watercolor illusion is best when the inner and outer contours have chromaticities in opposite directions in color space. The most common complementary pair is orange and purple. The watercolor illusion is dependent on the combination of luminance and color contrast of the contour lines in order to have the color spreading effect occur.

== History ==
Baingio Pinna discovered the watercolor illusion in 1987, reporting it in Italian. Jack Broerse and Robert P. O'Shea independently discovered it in 1995, reporting it in English, although they called it "spread colour", relating it to neon colour spreading. Broerse, Tony Vladusich, and O’Shea, demonstrated the phenomenon in 1999 (Figure 1). Pinna, Gavin Brelstaff, and Lothar Spillmann published the first account of the phenomenon in English in 2001, giving it its current name. Since the discovery many experiments have been performed and analyzed to understand the concept of perception of the illusion compared to various Gestalt factors and the neural processes that create the illusion.

=== Watercolor illusion compared to Gestalt principles ===
The watercolor illusion has had much debate over whether it can be described by Gestalt psychology. Watercolor illusion has been considered a case of the Gestalt principles by some because of the similarity principles that describe the figure-ground (perception). According to the similarity principles (principles of grouping), elements are grouped together based on its color, brightness, size and shape. There are seven Gestalt factors that the Watercolor Illusion filling of the figure-ground organization were compared to: proximity, good continuation, closure, symmetry, convexity, amodal completion, and past experience. These seven factors were tested in a series of experiments by Pinna, Werner, and Spillman to determine the strength of each factor compared to the illusion.

The first experiment tested the watercolor effect versus proximity to determine the figure-ground segregation. According to the Gestalt factor of proximity, closer elements are more likely to be grouped together. The stimuli had different spacing between the set of contour/flank lines. Each stimuli used had a vastly different response, but the watercolor illusion held true even in the wide spaces of the illusion. In some cases, the figure-ground areas were reversed as the filling-in of the orange flank was stronger than the filling in of the purple.

The second experiment tested the watercolor effect versus good continuation. In good continuation, the smooth continuation areas tend to be grouped together. With different variations of a square-wave pattern and basic contours with fringes, the good continuation of the stimuli was studied. It was determined that the uniform watercolor illusion is seen in only closed space.

The third experiment studied the watercolor illusion stimulus against the idea of closure and surroundness. According to the closure principle, piece creating a closed figure are grouped together. When one region encompasses another region completely, the surrounding region is perceived as ground, and the feature that is perceived as figure according to the surroundness principle. When the four purple rectangles were surrounded by a larger rectangle, the large rectangle was rarely perceived as figure while the four rectangles were seen as figures. When orange contours bordered the inside of the large rectangle, but outside the four smaller rectangles, the larger rectangle was perceived as figure while the small rectangles were perceived as holes. This showed that the closure and surroundness were weaker than the watercolor illusion.

The fourth experiment was watercolor effect versus symmetry. Parallel contours are grouped together according to the Gestalt principle of symmetry. Parallel wavy lines (rivers) were spaced apart with the purple contours on the inside and orange on the outside. Opposite of the principle, the rivers were not perceived as filed in, but the interspaces between the rivers were perceived to be filled in, or as figure in this case.

The fifth experiment was watercolor illusion compared to convexity. According to the “law of the inside” the concave regions of the stimulus should be perceived as ground and the convex ones perceived as figure. The stimuli used had different sets of concave and convex arcs alternating between two horizontal lines. The concave regions were typically perceived as figure whether the purple was flanked by red or orange fringes. However, as the curvature was increased the effect was decreased when the red fringes were used.

The sixth experiment was amodal completion compared to the watercolor illusion. Amodal completion is not a classical principle of figure-ground segregation that helps explain the perception of an object’s hidden regions. This applies to both figure and ground in the organization. From the experiments, amodal completion does not hold true when the watercolor illusion reversed the perceived segregation of components.

The seventh experiment was to determine if the observer would see the color spread effect if the stimulus was of a common object. From this, it was determined that spaces with prior knowledge (familiar words, shapes, etc. ) are more likely to be grouped together.

=== Strength of color spread effect experiments ===
Several experiments were performed to determine the necessary criteria to have the watercolor illusion viewed. The outcome of the experiments affected the properties that were defined by the coloration effect (below).

The first experiment was done to determine the distance over which the color spreading effect occurred. 25 stimuli of different dimension were hand–drawn with magic markers: purple for the outside border and orange for the inner fringe. The stimuli were presented 50 cm away from the observer with no time limit on determining the color spread. It was determined that the color spreading reported from the experiment decreased with increasing length of the shorter axis. The determined threshold was a height of 45 degrees of visual angle for the height of the surface.

The second experiment was to determine the duration of the exposed stimuli to see the illusion. Again, the stimuli were shown to the observer 50 cm away in an ambient lighted room. An electromagnetic shutter was in front of one eye. The smallest interval for the electromagnetic shutter was 100 ms, and the continuous color could be seen at the time duration. It was determined that the watercolor illusion could be perceived instantaneously in the given conditions.

The third experiment was to determine the optimal line thickness. Various thicknesses of the border and fringe were drawn for the stimulus pattern. The observers compared the strength and uniformity of the illusion between the various stimuli. The color spreading was perceived the strongest when the contour and fringe subtended a visual angle of 6 arcminutes; The strength of the illusion was discovered to decrease as the thickness of lines increased.

The fourth experiment was evaluating the waviness of the lines used compared to the strength of the illusion. The stimulus patterns varied in frequency of sinusoidal waves. The results showed increase of strength with increasing spatial frequency of the sinusoidal waves. The effects are the strongest with the wave patterns, however, the watercolor illusion is still strong for a stimulus with straight borders.

The fifth experiment tested inducing color. The colors were drawn with magic marker with pairs of red, green, blue, and yellow lines. Red and blue pairs produced the strongest effects while green and yellow produced the weakest illusion effect. All combinations of two colors produced a clearly visible spreading effect.

The sixth experiment tested the contrast between the different color lines to see which produced the most striking effect. Pinna first discovered the watercolor illusion with high contrast lines (a black outer line and lighter fringe). When the luminance between the two lines is different, the color spreading effect is the strongest. As the luminance between the two lines becomes closer, the spreading effect grows weaker but is still present.

Limitations of the watercolor illusion were studied. The color-spreading effect occurs on colored backgrounds in addition to the white or gray. In the case of a colored background, the watercolor illusion color spread does not mix with the background color but does get superimposed onto the colored background. For lighting conditions, the color spreading effect declines as the illumination in the room increases. It is the strongest at medium illumination. Lastly, the watercolor illusion persists even when dotted lines are used for the purple contour and orange fringe instead of continuous lines.

== Watercolor illusion and its phenomenal effects ==
=== The coloration effect ===
The coloration effect is one of the phenomenal effects of watercolor illusions. Pinna and Reeves, (2006) identified thirteen properties of the coloration effect through experiments of the water color illusion. All of the main properties can be seen with any pair of complementary (opposite in color space) contour lines. However, from the experiment described above, purple and orange have been found to produce the strongest effects. The thirteen properties are: the stimulus (1) is uniform, (2) solid and (3) can be perceived on a white, black or, colored background (the background does not affect the experiment as the color spread effect is superimposed on it without any mixing). (4) The orange hue is best observed if the object contains wiggly lines, though it is perceived with straight or dotted lines. (5) The effect can work with all basic colors, though (6) the effect is shown better when the lines have a high luminance contrast. (7) The line with the less luminance to the background will always produce the coloration effect. For example the light orange line spreads to produce the color spreading effect. (8) If the lines were reversed and the orange was on the outside than the orange hue would appear to be penetrating outward of the object while the purple line would be on the inside. Some other properties are the following: (9) the coloration extends about 45 visual degrees (found in experiments listed above); (10) the coloration is complete by 100 millisecond the smallest possible measurable unit due to the experiment equipment; (11) the line width that produces the best coloration effect is 6 arc minutes; (12) the color also spreads in directions other than the line; (13) and lastly it can induce a complementary color when one of the lines is achromatic and the other is chromatic.

=== Figure-ground effect and object-hole effect ===
The figure-ground effect makes an object appear solid and opaque. The object appears as if it can be either the background or the figure. Through switching the two contour lines, reverses the perception of the stimuli. For example, if the purple contour fringed by orange perceives a figure, when the colored contours are reversed, ground is perceived. In other words, the color spreading effect determines how the figure-ground effect is perceived. In most cases, the color spread tint is perceived as figure and the surrounding area is perceived as ground. As in the coloration effect, the watercolor illusion can show a figure-ground effect on white, black and colored backgrounds. The object-hole effect happens when the object of the watercolor illusion has a hole inside of it. The hole appears 3D and can help define what is figure and what is background. This can be difficult in determining if the boundaries of the hole belong to the background or the watercolor region because it appears that both options can be true. This effect can also be increased by increasing the number of lines.

== Dissociation between coloration and figure-ground effects ==
Coloration and figure-ground are two of the effects that can be observed within the watercolor illusion. Dissociation implies that coloration can be observed without the figure-ground effect, and that the figure-ground effect can be observed without color spreading into the inside edges. Border ownership assignment mechanisms (the consistency of color border and the asymmetric shape of edge) determine the figure-ground effects while the surface color from visual cortex lead to the color illusion. Coloration without the figure-ground effect can be acquired by using equal luminance adjacent contours that show a flat and reversible figure-ground organization. This coloration is dependent on the luminance and colors of the inducing contour lines. In the figure-ground effect, the asymmetric luminance profile between the two lines gives a 3-D perspective with the lower contrast side appearing to bulge Figure-ground effect without coloration, the result is a figure that appears flat (does not appear 3-D). The coloration is most likely absent because of a blending of the two colored lines and not a high enough contrast between the two colors.

== Neural processing ==
The coloration and figural effects from above come from parallel processes occurring in the brain. The two stages are the feature processing stage and the parallel boundary processing stage. At the feature processing stage, the area around the lines produces small interactions between the lines which leads to the color spreading. The parallel boundary processing stage organizes the geometrical structure of the stimulus into the color spreading of the watercolor illusion. However, the neural mechanisms are more complex as reducing the geometric structure of the stimulus changes the appearance and strength of the watercolor illusion.

According to Pinna and Grossberg, the FAÇADE model better models the brain activity that occurs when the watercolor illusion is viewed. The FAÇADE model illustrates that the boundary contour system (BCS) and feature contour system (FCS) in parallel. The BCS does boundary grouping and the FCS does the surface filling in. These two processes occur within the regions V1 (primary visual cortex) through V4 (V2 through V4 are three extrastriate visual cortical areas). The FAÇADE model is weakened when the edges are low contrast to each other.

Another modeling of neural processes of the brain that occur when the watercolor illusion stimulus is seen is the LAMINART model. This model demonstrates that stimulus is processed in the layers 6 and 4 of the cortical areas V1 and V2. The LAMINART model betters explains spatial competition which occurs when the boundary is weakened (e.g. dotted line). Also, the LAMINART model does not completely reduces the illusion visualization if the stimulus is low-contrast.

== Application ==
The blue and orange border gives the illusion that the map of Australia is filled in pale yellow though it is actually white

Applications of the watercolor illusion capitalize on the limitation of the human visual system. The watercolor effect can be used by artists or illustrators who want to create the effect that the illusion gives off. If they want to create a light hue of a color they can take advantage of this effect and do not have to use any color to make it look like the object is filled in. Another possible application is in computer graphics rendering. If a certain tint or light color wants to fill a small space, the watercolor illusion can be applied to reduce rendering time as well amount of color used.

== See also ==
- Amodal perception
- Opponent process
- Gestalt Psychology
- Figure–ground (perception)
- Mach band
- Neon color spreading
- Perception
- Vision
