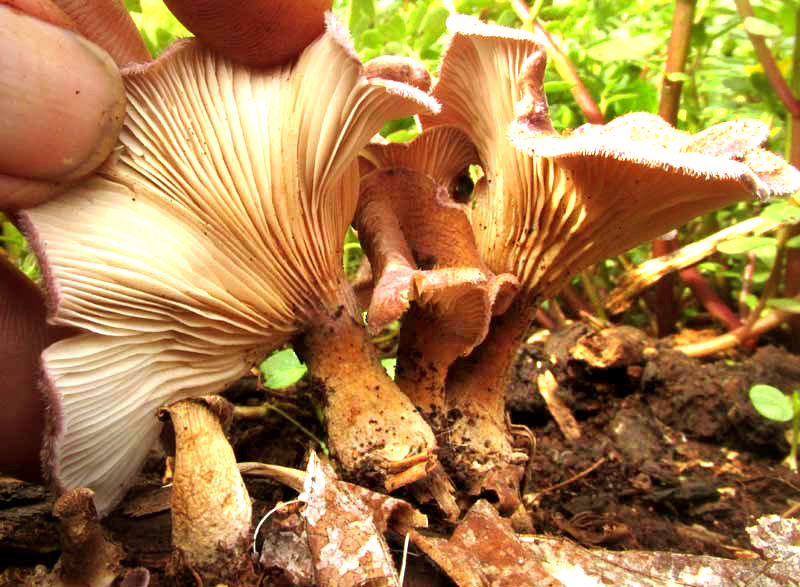

Scientific classification
- Kingdom: Fungi
- Division: Basidiomycota
- Class: Agaricomycetes
- Order: Polyporales
- Family: Panaceae
- Genus: Panus
- Species: P. neostrigosus

Binomial name
- Panus neostrigosus Drechsler-Santos & Wartchow

Synonyms
- List: Agaricus crinitus Schwein. DC; Agaricus hirtus Secr.; Agaricus schweinitzii Steud.; Agaricus strigosus Schwein. DC; Agaricus strigosus subsp. strigosus; Lentinus lecomtei Fr.; Panus lecomtei (Fr.) Corner; Pocillaria lecomtei (Fr.) Kuntze; Lentinus strigosus Fr.; Pocillaria strigosa (Fr.) Kuntze; Lentinus strigosus var. tenuipes Berk. & Broome; Panus lecomtei var. semirudis (Singer) Zmitr., Bondartseva, Perevedentseva, Myasnikov & Kovalenko; Panus rudis var. semirudis (Singer) Singer; Panus semirudis Singer; Panus lecomtei var. stipitatus (Malk.) Zmitr., Bondartseva, Perevedentseva, Myasnikov & Kovalenko; Panus rudis f. stipitata Malk.; Pocillaria frieseana Kuntze

= Panus neostrigosus =

Species of fungus

Panus neostrigosus
- Mycological characteristics
- Gills on hymenium
- Cap is infundibuliform or offset
- Hymenium is decurrent
- Stipe is bare
- Spore print is white to purple
- Ecology is saprotrophic
- Edibility is choice

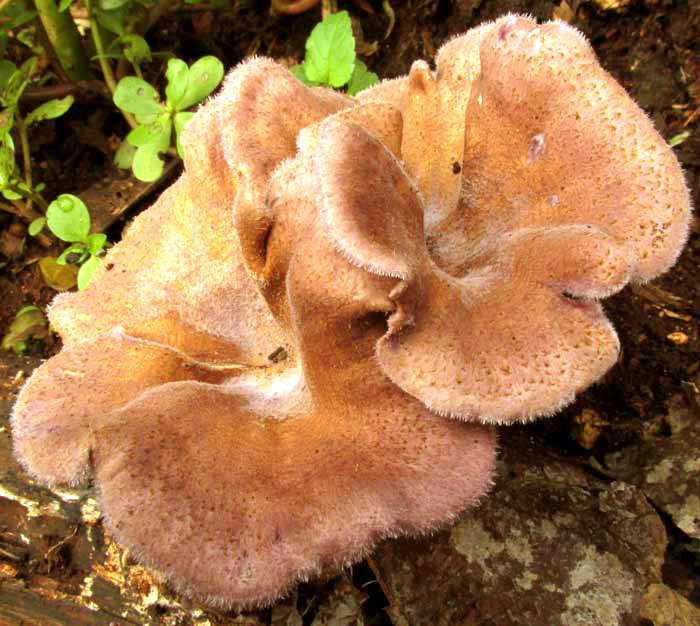
Panus neostrigosus hairy caps

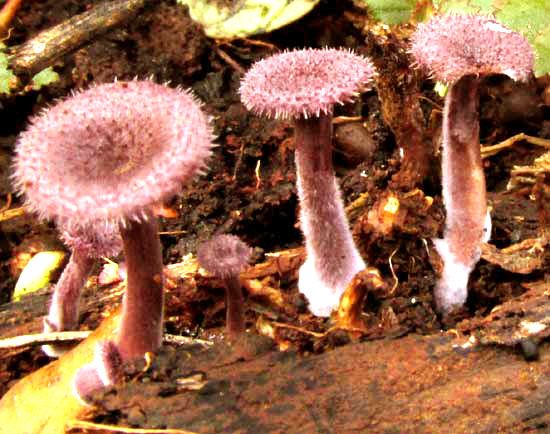
Young Panus neostrigosus more violet than mature ones

Panus neostrigosus, known as hairy oyster mushroom, hairy panus and similar names, is a species of mushroom found nearly worldwide in moderate environments. It belongs to the relatively newly erected Family, the Panaceae.

== Description ==
The hairy oyster mushroom is fairly easy to identify. Here are its main features:

- It is a saprophyte occurring on dead wood and usually grows in clusters.
- Its cap, or pileus, is up to 6 cm (2 1/2 in) wide. When young its margin is inrolled, and the cap's general shape is round in outline or tongue-shaped to irregular. The surface is densely hairy with trichomes up to 2 mm (1/16 in) long. At first the cap may be purplish, but fades to white or creamy, eventually becoming pale brownish.
- Its closely arranged gills run down the stem and short gills are common among the long ones.
- Its stem can can reach 2 cm (3/4 in) long and up to 1 cm (3/8 in) wide. Usually its attachment with the cap is off-center or at the side. The base usually is slightly enlarged. It becomes tough, dry, densely hairy, and whitish or colored like the cap.
- Its flesh is whitish and somewhat tough and stringy, with an indistinct taste, or maybe bitter.
- The spore print is creamy to yellowish.

== Distribution and ecology ==
Panus neostrigosus occurs extensively across the world where the climate is neither excessively cold nor dry.

The hairy oyster mushroom is a general saprotroph occurring on decomposing or recently burned wood, areas in cultivation as amid stubble, in places exposed to the sun, and in tropical forests.

The Polyporaceae "Panus strigosus" – an ambiguous and obsolete name that occasionally was used for the hairy oyster mushroom – has been claimed as food of the pleasing fungus beetle Triplax flavicollis; as this species has otherwise been noted to eat the unrelated but visually similar common oyster mushroom Pleurotus ostreatus exclusively, the "P.strigosus" claim is probably erroneous.

== As food ==
In Colombia the Uitoto people cooked hairy oyster mushrooms in broth or wrapped them in yarumo (Cecropia) leaves. Also the Yanomamo people regard them as edible. However, southern Mexico's Lacandon people, who eat many mushroom kinds, do not use them. In general the mushroom is regarded as safe, but too tough, thin, hairy and sometimes bitter to eat.

=== In biofuel production ===
The mycelial form of the hairy oyster mushroom is a white rot fungus which decomposes the lignin, cellulose and hemicellulose of plant remains. This can make the fungus useful in the pretreatment of many forms of biodegradable waste used in the manufacture of biofuel.

=== Medicinal properties ===
A study using as a standard model for obesity the nematode known as Caenorhabditis elegans found that an extract in ethanol of Panus neostrigosus mushrooms showed promise as a natural and effective agent for suppressing the appetite and preventing obesity.

== Taxonomy ==
In 2012 the name Panus neostrigosus was formally described as a new taxon exhibiting a new combination of attributes of existing species, about which there has been taxonomic confusion.

For example, much discussion has taken place as to whether Panus neostrigosus correctly should be designated Panus lecomtei. Two earlier taxa, Lentinus strigosus and Lentinus lecomtei, had been accepted as distinct species, but later they were considered to be the same taxon. Art. 11.5 of the International Code of Nomenclature for algae, fungi, and plants states that when a choice exists between legitimate names of equal priority, the first name to be effectively published should be chosen. Of the two taxa, Lentinus strigosus was the first. However, now it may seem best to recognize that the fungus in question best belongs in the genus Panus. Instead of simply transferring Lentinus strigosus into the genus as Panus strigosus, it was decided to create a new species, Panus neostrigosus, while redescribing it with traits clearly applying to both of the earlier Lentinus species. It appears that some accept this approach, and others do not. In 2026, the trend seems to be toward favoring the name Panus neostrigosus.

=== Etymology ===
In 1838 when Elias Magnus Fries named the genus Panus, no mention was made of why the name Panus was chosen. However, a good bet is that it derives from the Latin pannus meaning "a cotton cloth or rag," referring to the kind of hairy, ragged-looking mushroom caps seen on species in the genus.

The species name neostrigosus, with neo- meaning "new," translates to "new strigosus, the strigosus being from Lentinus strigosus, the taxon upon which it was based.
