= Phantom contour =

Type of illusory contour

A phantom contour is a type of illusory contour. Most illusory contours are seen in still images, such as the Kanizsa triangle and the Ehrenstein illusion. A phantom contour, however, is perceived in the presence of moving or flickering images with contrast reversal. The rapid, continuous alternation between opposing, but correlated, adjacent images creates the perception of a contour that is not physically present in the still images. Quaid et al. have also authored a PhD thesis on the phantom contour illusion and its spatiotemporal limits (University of Waterloo) which maps out limits and proposes mechanisms for its perception centering around magnocellularly driven visual area MT (see also Quaid et al., 2005 on www.pubmed.com).

== Example ==
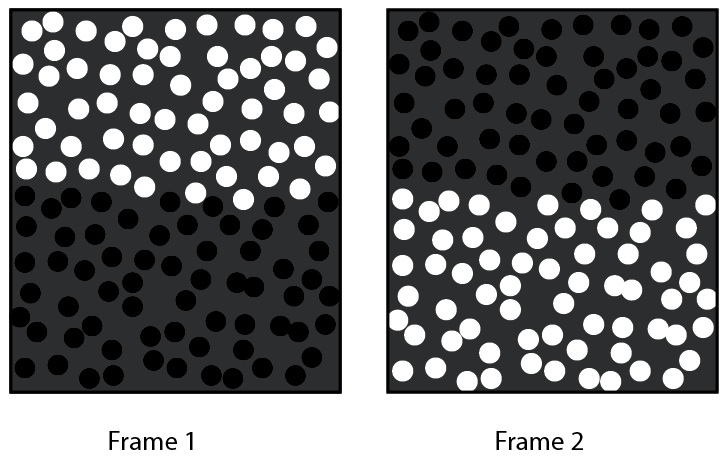
When these two frames flicker back and forth, the illusion of a horizontal phantom contour appears between the black and white dots. Images inspired by the Rodgers-Ramachandran and Ramachandran 1998 study stimuli.

One example of this illusion involves stimuli consisting of two similar frames, with uniform grey backgrounds: in one frame, the top half contains white dots and the bottom half contains black dots. A second frame contains the reverse of the first frame, in which the white dots of the first frame are replaced with black dots and the black dots are replaced with white dots. The rapid alternation between these two frames reverses the polarity of the dots, while keeping their positions static.

At high temporal frequencies (20 Hz), the alternating frames are perceived as one non-flickering image, where the individual dots are no longer visible, while simultaneously creating the illusion of a distinct border, dividing the top and bottom halves of the display. This perceived border is a phantom contour illusion.

== History ==
Perceived borders similar to the phantom contour, observed via luminance contrasts, were reported in 1987, when Livingstone and Hubel analyzed various aspects of vision, and linked them to the magno- and parvocellular subsystems. Vilayanur S. Ramachandran and D.S. Rogers-Ramachandran's subsequent research, however, helped pare down and solidify the concept of phantom contours. Their research was also the first use of “texture borders” to induce this illusion. Ramachandran and Rogers-Ramachandran's research has since led to several more papers on the topic, with varying conclusions regarding the underlying mechanisms responsible for these illusions, as well as considerations for this illusion's potential link to dyslexia.

See Theories of dyslexia.

== Magnocellular pathway ==
One theory suggests that temporal-frequency processing in the magnocellular pathway, an anatomical pathway that originates in the retina, goes through the lateral geniculate nucleus, and ends in the primary visual cortex, may be connected to the appearance of this illusion (Skottun and Skoyles debated this link in 2006). The magnocellular pathway is contrast-sensitive, sensitive to motion, and also sensitive to flashing black-to-white edges. Livingstone and Hubel looked at lateral geniculate cells in both the magno- and parvocellular layers, and found responses to luminance contrasts to be much stronger in magnocellular cells. These cells also had better spatial and temporal resolution. Additionally, the magnocelluar pathway is activated more by peripheral vision, in contrast to the parvocelluar pathway, which is activated more by central vision. Rogers-Ramachandran and Ramachandran tested whether or not this preference for peripheral stimuli in the magnocellular cells would have an effect on phantom contour perception. As was predicted, sparsely spaced objects, which degrade the perception of the contours in central vision, were more easily perceived when subjects adjusted their fixation from 0 to 5 degrees eccentricity. This supports the idea that magnocellular cells are responsible for phantom contour perception under such conditions.

== Clinical use ==
Ramachandran and Rogers-Ramachandran proposed that the phantom contour illusion could be used to test whether or not a person's magnocellular pathway is functioning properly, as well as provide a means for analyzing the role and function of the magnocellular system in general. Loss of magnocellular function can be found in the early stages of glaucoma.

Insight into the connection between this illusion and temporal-frequency processing could help us understand underlying mechanisms responsible for certain types of dyslexia (learning impairments in one's reading ability). Deficits in rapid visual processing have been seen in dyslexics and are believed to be linked to deficits in the magnocellular pathway. Differential sensitivities to temporal-frequency processing may play a role in both the perception of phantom contours, as well as certain reading impairments. Sperling et al. found that children with phonological dyslexia (a deficit related to coding meaning of soundsystems of language) showed a decreased ability in perceiving phantom contours, and thus, may be experiencing a magnocellular deficit. Additionally, based on rigorous testing of the dyslexics’ reading abilities, which were compared to their inability to process phantom contours, they found a negative correlation between this magnocellular deficit and reading ability, suggesting a link between magnocellular deficits and orthographic processing (storing patterns of letters in the visual processing system). This is consistent with the theory that some dyslexic people may have motion perception deficits. The pan-sensory deficit hypothesis with regard to dyslexics, states that a deficit in processing rapidly changing stimuli may be a congenital deficit in magnocellular or magnocellular-like processing.

== Variations ==
=== Achromatic vs. chromatic images ===
Children with dyslexia possess a lower flicker frequency threshold compared to non-dyslexics when the phantom contour images are achromatic (lacking in color). However, when presented with similar images to the black and white dot images mentioned above, but using equiluminant (a.k.a. isoluminant) color, in which the luminance of the colors is the same but the hue is not, the illusion disappears for non-dyslexics as well. Adding a luminance difference as small as 10% between the colors, however, re-activates the illusion. This finding suggests that the parvocelluar pathway, which is sensitive to color, is not responsible for this illusion. The magnocelluar pathway, in contrast, is believed to be insensitive to color. Ramachandran and Rogers-Ramachandran compared using equiluminance contours on these tasks to using a psychophysical “scalpel” to separate the visual pathway subsystems based on their functional roles.

=== Spatial vs. temporal frequency ===
When the stimuli used to present phantom contours consist of adjacent dark and light achromatic horizontal stripes (squarewave gratings), variations in spatial and temporal frequency can be examined. An increase or decrease in stripe thickness adjusts spatial frequency, and temporal frequency is manipulated by increases and decreases in flicker rate. Findings show that as spatial frequency is increased, sensitivity to temporal frequency decreases. For example, with a temporal frequency of 7 Hz, the spatial frequency required in order for subjects to perceive the phantom contour was 8.96 cycles degree ^{−1}. Subjects lost the ability to detect temporal phase when temporal frequency was above 7 Hz, indicating they relied on some other cue to detect phantom contours. This finding suggests that where phantom contours are processed along the visual system may change, depending on which pattern-detection technique is being utilized. Keily et al. looked at stimulus duration, with relation to presentation of flickering images, and found no detection improvement between 34 and 340 milliseconds, suggesting that the first couple of flicker frames are crucial to phantom contour perception.

=== Stimulus size and number ===
When analyzing flicker-generated forms, Quaid and Flanagan noted that, as stimulus size increased, phase-contrast thresholds for these phantom contours decreased. Additionally, thresholds decreased as the number of observed stimuli increased. Large sized stimuli paired with a large number of stimuli produced the lowest thresholds of all.

=== Phantom objects ===
The perception of phantom contours extends beyond just a straight border between two halves of a frame. Researchers have employed shapes and alphabetical letters to represent this illusion as well. The presentation is similar to a pseudoisochromatic plate (namely an Ishihara plate), but instead of detecting color blindness, this test is intended to detect magnocellular pathway deficits. The contrast reversal at high temporal frequencies eliminates the dot patterns making up the object and the background, thus leaving only the perception of the object border to define the object. As with phantom border tasks, longer exposure times to the flickering images show no enhancement of the illusion, once again indicating that very few frame flickers are needed in order for the illusion to be present. Longer ramp durations (onset and offset times of the stimulus presentation), however, drastically increase thresholds for contour illusion detection and eventually eliminate the perceived illusion completely. Also consistent with the border tasks, converting the images into equiluminant colors eliminates the illusion of these object borders.

== Controversy ==
There is debate as to whether or not flicker rate is the defining characteristic dividing the phantom contours of the magnocellular pathway and the “surface characteristics” of the parvocellular pathway. Surface characteristics are defined as the perception of the absolute temporal phase of the flickering images, which becomes apparent at lower frequencies (5–7 Hz). In other words, surface characteristics are visible when we are able to see the images flickering from one to the other. This perception occurs at lower flicker rates. At high flicker rates, the images appear as one image. Skottun and Skoyles found several potential holes in the theory that the percept of phantom contours represents magnocellular activity, and the percept of surface characteristics represents parvocellular activity. One argument is that the high temporal frequencies used to activate the phantom contour illusion (>15 Hz) are not optimal frequencies for magnocellular neurons. Optimal frequencies for both magno- and parvocellular neurons are similar to each other and are closer to the range of 5–7 Hz, the frequency range where surface characteristics can be seen. Additionally, they claim that, due to a phase-locking response of parvocellular neurons at high temporal frequencies, there are likely other mechanisms at play when perceiving surface characteristics at these higher temporal frequencies.

Skottun and Skoyles also question whether the perception of phantom contours is specifically related to luminance. Our inability to process color at high temporal frequencies may be more related to how the parvocellular system functions, rather than being a defining difference between the parvo- and magnocellular systems. Further, they surmise that detection of surface characteristics at low temporal frequencies may be due to processing further on in the visual system, based on the fact that cortical neurons have longer integration times, compared to the subcortical neurons found in the magno- and parvocellular systems. Quaid and Flanagan recommend looking to the dorsal stream for illusory contour processing, claiming that motion-defined-forms may be detected, even with a magnocellular deficit. They also point out that the dorsal stream mediates low contrast, high temporal frequency stimuli, as well as motion, making it a viable candidate for processing this illusion.

When addressing the theory that magnocellular deficits play a potential role in dyslexia, Skottun and Skoyles argue that it may be more of an overall temporal processing deficit, not just a magnocelluar deficit. They claim the inability of dyslexic children to process stimuli that change rapidly or occur briefly may be unrelated to the magnocellular system. Ultimately, they conclude that further research is needed to back the theory that phantom contours and surface characteristics are caused by the magnocelluar and parvocellular systems, respectively, and, therefore, it would be wise not to limit one's research of phantom contours and surface characteristics exclusively to the analysis of how the magno- and parvocellular systems function.
