= Neon color spreading =

Optical illusion

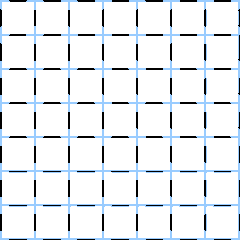
Blue circles replace the intersecting blue lines, especially when viewed from a distance.

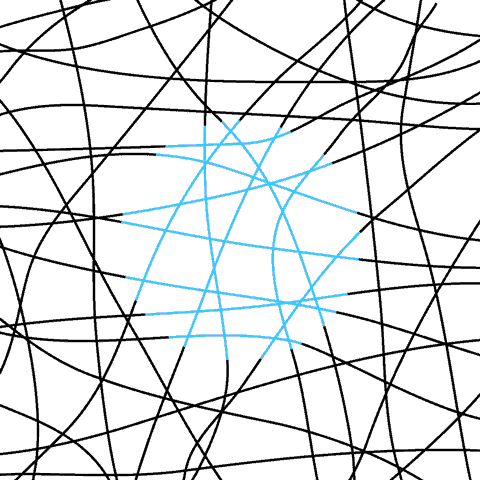
An example of neon color spreading. A blue inner circle appears within the black contours. In the actual image this area is white, which is made evident if the image is magnified.

Neon color spreading (also referred to as neon-like color spreading) is an optical illusion in the category of transparency effects, characterized by fluid borders between the edges of a colored object and the background in the presence of black lines. The illusion was first documented in 1971 and was eventually rediscovered in 1975 by Van Tuijl.

"Neon" references a neon tube and the bright colors that appear within one. "Color spreading" references how the colors seem to spread out from the center of the colored portion of the object.

Neon color spreading is similar to the watercolor illusion, though the two effects are produced in different ways.

== Causes ==
The exact causes of the neon color spreading illusion are not known. It seems to occur most often when black lines are substituted with colored lines on a white background. One theory as to why this happens is that the simultaneous stimulation between the visual processing of lines and the color receptors in the eyes are not congruent. For this reasoning to work neon effects would only be possible if all black lines and colored lines were in contact, however there are illusions where this is not the case.

Another theory about the illusion is that it occurs due to aberrations of perceptual mechanisms. If this were the case, the effect would not require such specific conditions to occur and would often be perceived when viewing colors under normal conditions. This reasoning works to discount chromatic aberration as the cause.

Other theories about reasons for the effect have proposed that it occurs within non-random patterns. Others state that it is necessary for there to be straight lines for the effect to occur. This is not the case as many neon effects happen within random patterns and on curved lines.

Neon color spreading is not an effect that usually occurs naturally. It is speculated that the effect occurs due to failings in visual processing. Since human beings would never see the effect naturally, there would be no reason to evolve in such a way that the trait disappears. Some studies theorize that the factors that make up the effect occur within the primary visual cortex and the V2 visual area where image contours are enhanced.

== Illusory contours ==
Kanizsa's Triangle is created by illusory contours.

An example of a circle created by color spreading.

The neon color spreading effect works in a similar way to another illusion: illusory contours. Illusory contours are characterized by the appearance of contours due to the implication that they are there. Neon color spreading is better characterized by the generation of contours by the changing color of black lines. They can both create the perception of contours where there are none.

Although the effects of both are similar, they can occur under different conditions. Targets under separate lighting conditions have been shown to exhibit either the color spreading effect or the illusory contour effect. This suggests that they are in fact two different effects.

Illusory contours and neon color spreading are often difficult to differentiate. Neon color spreading is characterized by the color being used to create the visual phenomena. This tricks the visual system into thinking that there is color where there is not. Illusory contours cause a similar fooling of the visual system into perceiving contours by causing effects where the contours should be. They are both fooling the visual system in similar ways, but are characterized differently.

== Color effects ==
Another aspect of neon color spreading that can affect the magnitude of the illusion are the colors used within the illusion. Different colors tend to cause a less or more intense illusion. Changing the color of the background can also enhance or inhibit the effect. If contrasting colors are used, such as a yellow background with blue and black lines, the effect will be enhanced. If similar colors are used, the effect will be inhibited.

=== Blue and red versus green and yellow ===
Long and short wavelength light, where the human eye is less sensitive to spatial detail, seem to enhance the effect. This means that if the illusion is created with red or blue lines, black lines, and a white background, the effect will be more intense. This is particularly notable when the colors are more saturated. In contrast to this, green and yellow tend to suppress the effect of neon color spreading when used in the same way.

=== Ehrenstein figures ===
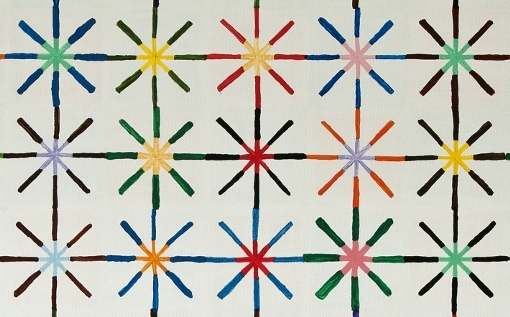
An example of different colored Ehrenstein figures.

Ehrenstein figures are a good way of easily making persistent color spreading effects. They show both the neon color spreading illusion and illusory contours, and show examples of differences in hue between inner and outer lines and how they affect the neon color spreading illusion.

=== Luminance ===
The brightness conditions under which the color spreading figures are viewed change the perceived intensity of the effect. Under bright lighting the effect will be inhibited and under dim lighting the effect will be enhanced.

Another important factor is the luminance of the color causing the effect. Studies have shown that the color should be higher in luminance than the dark lines supporting the effect and it should be lower in luminance than the background.

== See also ==
- Watercolor illusion
- Illusory contours
- Optical illusion
- Contrast effect
