= Lilac (color) =

Color

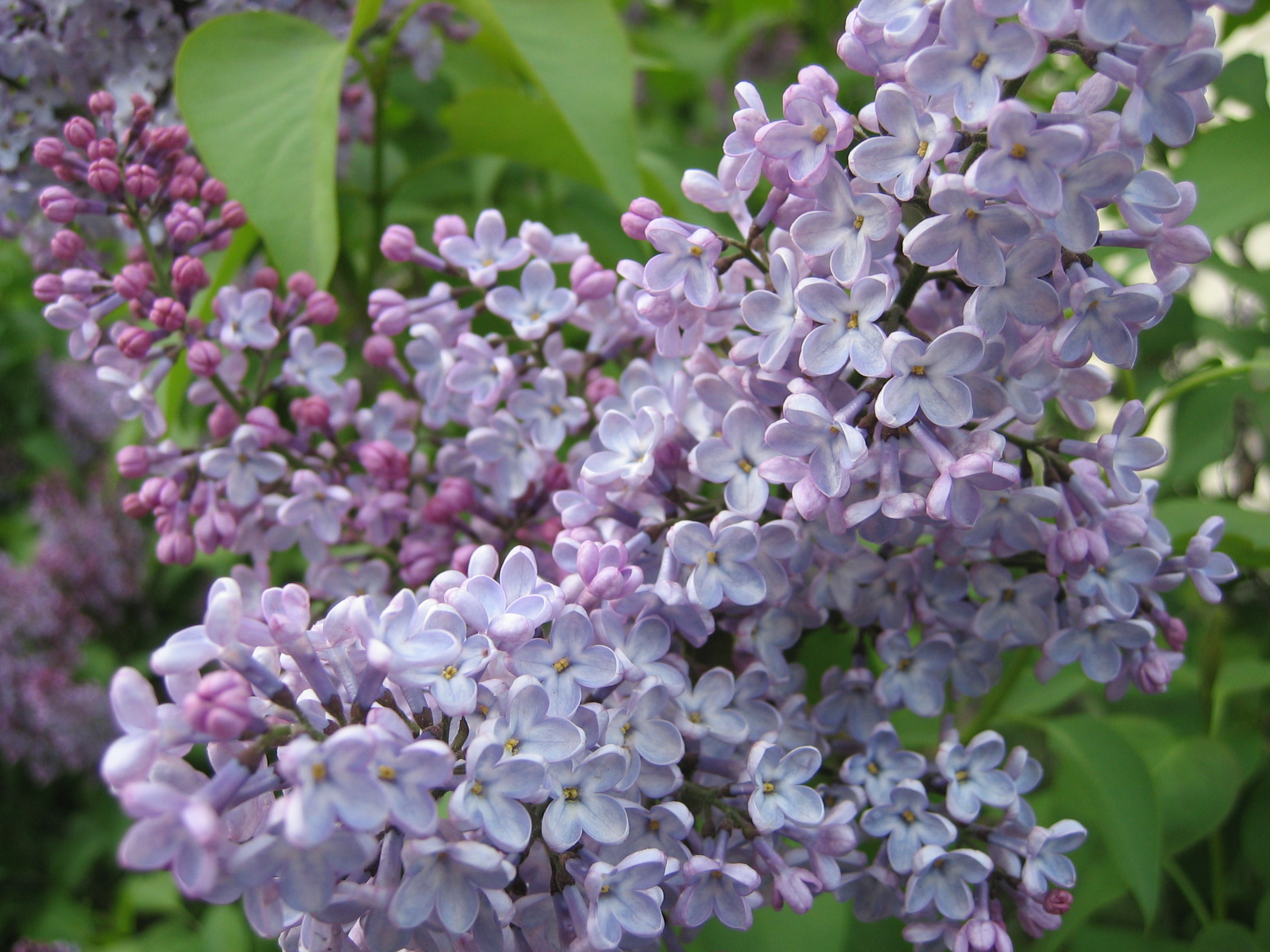

Color coordinates
- Hex triplet: #C8A2C8
- sRGB^{B} (r, g, b): (200, 162, 200)
- HSV (h, s, v): (300°, 19%, 78%)
- CIELCh_{uv} (L, C, h): (71, 32, 308°)
- ISCC–NBS descriptor: Light purple
- B: Normalized to [0–255] (byte)

Lilac is a light shade of purple or violet representing the average color of most lilac flowers. The colors of some lilac flowers may be equivalent to the colors shown below as pale lilac, rich lilac, or deep lilac. However, there are other lilac flowers that are colored red-violet.

The first recorded use of the term lilac as an English color name was in 1775.

== Variations ==
=== Pale lilac ===
Lilac (Pale lavender)

Color coordinates
- Hex triplet: #DCD0FF
- sRGB^{B} (r, g, b): (220, 208, 255)
- HSV (h, s, v): (255°, 18%, 100%)
- CIELCh_{uv} (L, C, h): (86, 37, 276°)
- ISCC–NBS descriptor: Very light violet
- B: Normalized to [0–255] (byte)

Pale lilac or Pale lavender is the color represented as lilac in the ISCC-NBS color list. The source of this color is sample 209 in the ISCC-NBS Dictionary of Color Names (1955).

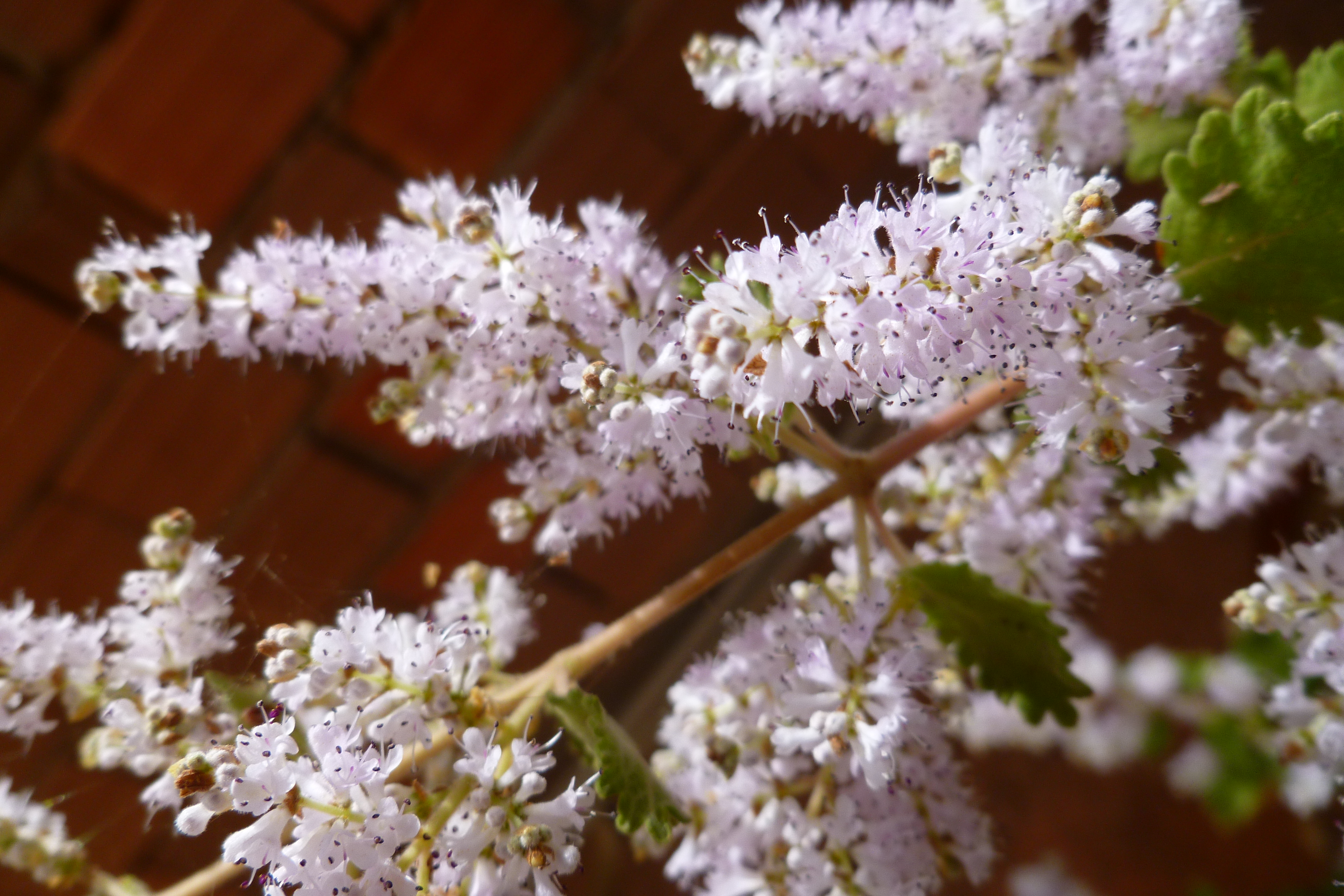
Pale lilac colored flowers of Tetradenia riparia

=== Bright lilac ===
Lilac (Crayola)

Color coordinates
- Hex triplet: #D891EF
- sRGB^{B} (r, g, b): (216, 145, 239)
- HSV (h, s, v): (285°, 39%, 94%)
- CIELCh_{uv} (L, C, h): (70, 72, 296°)
- Source: Crayola
- ISCC–NBS descriptor: Brilliant purple
- B: Normalized to [0–255] (byte)

The color bright lilac (displayed adjacent) is the color labeled lilac by Crayola in 1994 as one of the colors in its Magic Scent specialty box of colors.

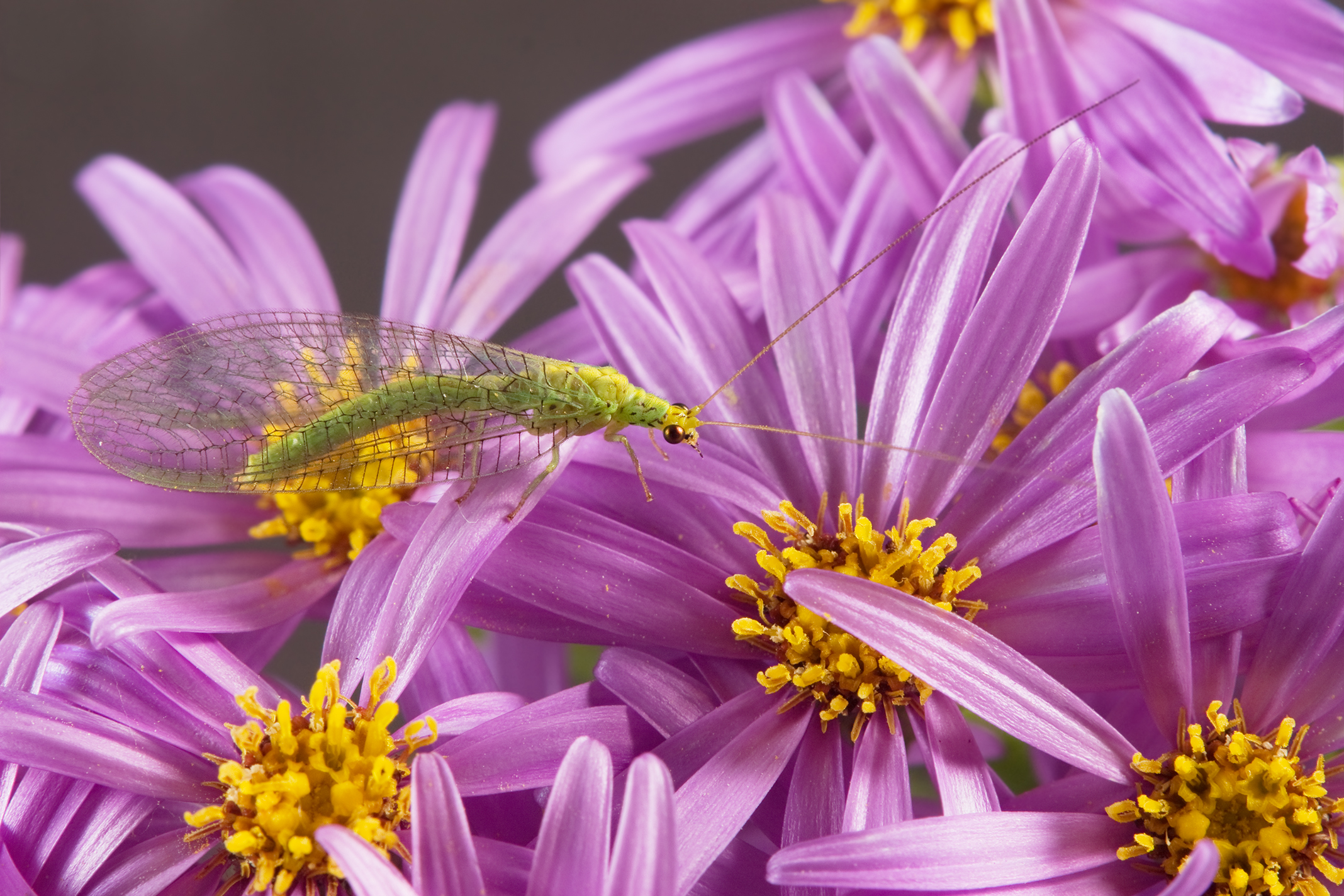
Bright lilac flower

=== Rich lilac ===
Lilac (Pourpre.com)

Color coordinates
- Hex triplet: #B666D2
- sRGB^{B} (r, g, b): (182, 102, 210)
- HSV (h, s, v): (284°, 51%, 82%)
- CIELCh_{uv} (L, C, h): (56, 80, 294°)
- Source: Pourpre.com at the Wayback Machine (archived August 10, 2022)
- ISCC–NBS descriptor: Vivid purple
- B: Normalized to [0–255] (byte)

Rich lilac, a rich tone of lilac labeled lilac at Pourpre.com (a popular French color list), is shown adjacent. Another name for this color is bright French lilac.

=== French lilac ===
French Lilac

Color coordinates
- Hex triplet: #86608E
- sRGB^{B} (r, g, b): (134, 96, 142)
- HSV (h, s, v): (290°, 32%, 56%)
- CIELCh_{uv} (L, C, h): (46, 36, 300°)
- Source: ISCC-NBS
- ISCC–NBS descriptor: Moderate purple
- B: Normalized to [0–255] (byte)

The color French lilac is displayed adjacent. This color was formulated for use in interior design, where a medium dark violet color is desired. The first recorded use of French lilac as a color name in the English language was in 1814.

The normalized color coordinates for French lilac are identical to pomp and power, first recorded as a color name in English in 1950.

== In nature ==
The lilac-breasted roller is a member of the roller family of birds. It is widely distributed in sub-Saharan Africa and the southern Arabian Peninsula.

== In culture ==
Lilac was a color associated with the final stages of mourning in English and European cultures.

lilac chaser is an optical illusion that commonly uses the color lilac.

Book and film Lilac Ball.

== See also ==
- Lavender
- Lilac chaser (illusion of visual perception)
- List of colors
