= Illusory contour =

Visual illusion evoking an edge

Kanizsa's triangle: These spatially separate fragments give the impression of a bright white triangle, defined by a sharp illusory contour, occluding three black circles and a black-outlined triangle.

An illusory contour or subjective contour is a visual illusion that evokes the perception of an edge without a luminance or color change across that edge. Illusory brightness and depth ordering often accompany illusory contours. Friedrich Schumann is often credited with the discovery of illusory contours around the beginning of the 20th century, but they are present in art dating to the Middle Ages. Gaetano Kanizsa's 1976 Scientific American paper marked the resurgence of interest in illusory contours for vision scientists.

== Common types ==
Perhaps the most famous example of an illusory contour is the triangle configuration popularized by Gaetano Kanizsa. Kanizsa figures trigger the percept of an illusory contour by aligning circles with wedge-shaped portions removed in the visual field such that the edges form a shape. Although not explicitly part of the image, Kanizsa figures evoke the perception of a shape, defined by a sharp illusory contour. Typically, the shape seems brighter than the background, even though the luminance is in reality homogeneous. Additionally, the illusory shape seem to be closer to the viewer than the inducers. Kanizsa figures involve modal completion of the illusory shape and amodal completion of the inducers.

The Ehrenstein illusion of a bright disc

Closely related to Kanizsa figures is the Ehrenstein illusion. Instead of employing circles with missing wedges, the Ehrenstein illusion triggers an illusory contour percept via radial line segments. Ehrenstein's discovery was originally contextualized as a modification of the Hermann grid.

In abutting line gratings, illusory contours are created at the boundary between two misaligned gratings. In these so-called abutting line gratings, the illusory contour is perpendicular to the inducing elements.

== Further examples ==
Figures 1 to 5 are based on the phenomenon of the Kanizsa triangle. In Figure 1, a 60° segment was removed from three circles in such a way that the human perception system expects the shape of an equilateral triangle and recognizes it as such, even though no circumferential contours actually exist. Figure 2 shows the apparent contours of a square, which is created by removing a 90° segment from each of the four circles. When the right angle is reduced or enlarged, the sides of the square are deformed inwards or outwards, as can be seen in Figures 3 and 4.

The left figure in Figure 5 shows the apparent contours of a square in the middle. On the other hand, the figure on the right proves that the shapes that make the apparent contours visible cannot be chosen arbitrarily. Here, for example, the surrounding black shape elements are too thin and therefore prevent the apparent perception of the square.

Figure 6 shows the illusory contour of a three-dimensional sphere.

Figure 1

Figure 2

Figure 3

Figure 4

Figure 5

Figure 6

== Cortical responses ==
It is thought that early visual cortical regions such as V1 V2 in the visual system are responsible for forming illusory contours. Studies using human neuroimaging techniques have found that illusory contours are associated with activity in the deep layers of primary visual cortex.

== Uses ==
Olympic Games logos from 1972, 1984, 1988, and 1994 all feature illusory contours, as does Ellsworth Kelly's 1950s series.

Jacob Gestman Geradts often used the Kanizsa illusion in his silkscreen prints, for instance in his work Formula 1 (1991).

== Related phenomena ==
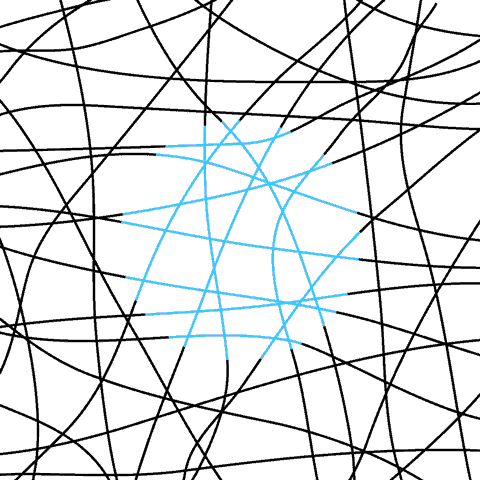
Neon color spreading: the cyan circle's contours are illusory

Visual illusions are useful stimuli for studying the neural basis of perception because they hijack the visual system's innate mechanisms for interpreting the visual world under normal conditions. For example, objects in the natural world are often only partially visible. Illusory contours provide clues for how the visual system constructs surfaces when portions of the surface's edge are not visible.

The encoding of surfaces is thought to be an indispensable part of visual perception, forming a critical intermediate stage of visual processing between the initial analysis of visual features and the ability to recognize complex stimuli like faces and scenes.

== See also ==
- Amodal perception
- Autostereogram – Visual illusion of 3D scene
- Filling-in – Phenomena in vision
- Gestalt psychology – Theory of perception
- Negative space – Space around an object
- Phantom contour – Type of illusory contour
