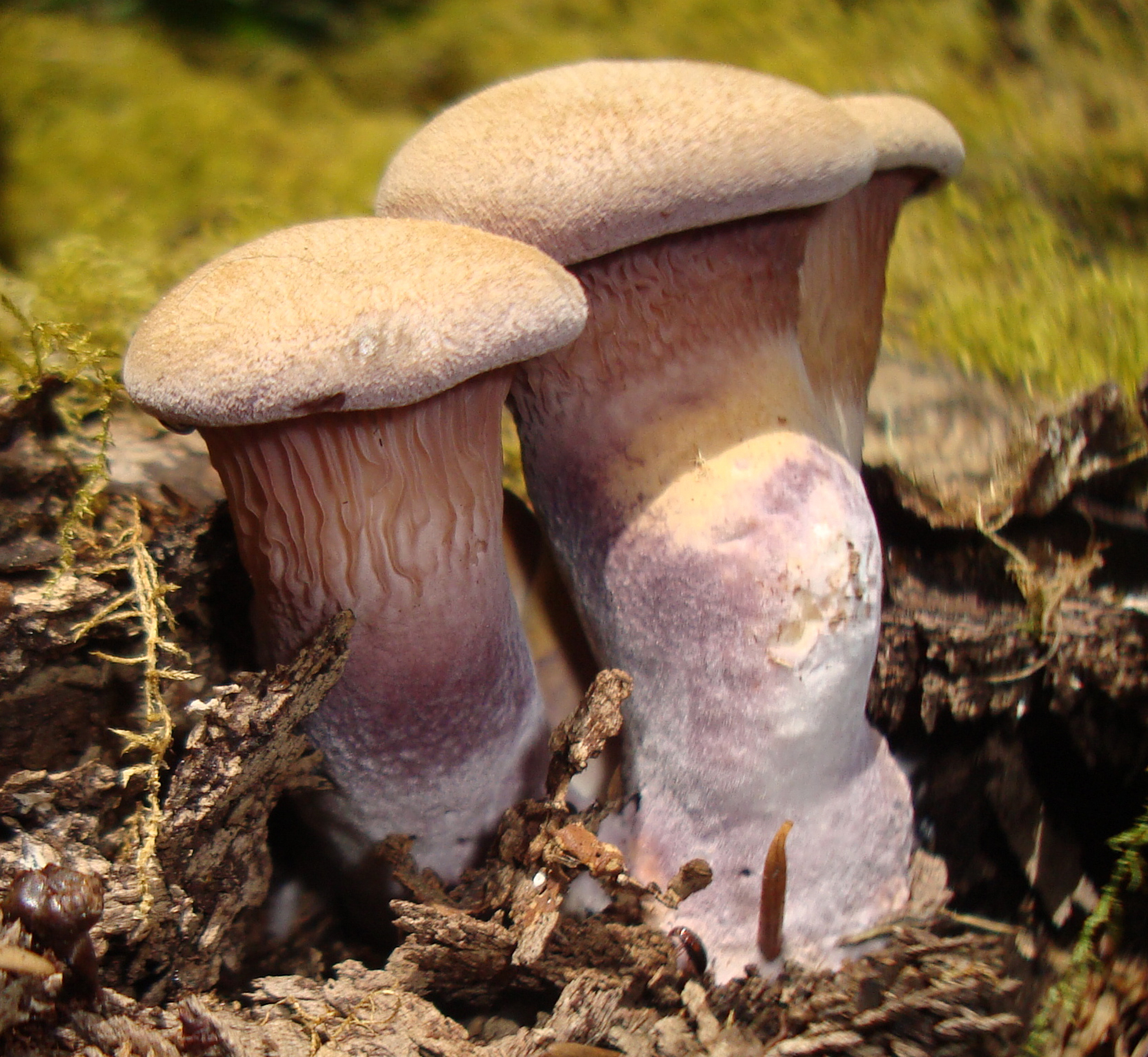
- Panus conchatus

Scientific classification
- Kingdom: Fungi
- Division: Basidiomycota
- Class: Agaricomycetes
- Order: Polyporales
- Family: Panaceae
- Genus: Panus; Fr. (1838)

Type species
- Panus conchatus (Bull.) Fr. (1838)

Synonyms
- Lentinopanus Pilát (1941); Velolentinus Overeem (1927)

= Panus =

Genus of fungi

Panus is a genus of fungi in the family Polyporaceae.

== Species ==
- Panus alpacus (Senthil. & S.K.Singh) Senthil. (2015)
- Panus bacillisporus Kauffman (1930)
- Panus bartlettii Massee (1907)
- Panus biersianus Har. & Pat. (1914)
- Panus brunneipes Corner (1981)
- Panus caespiticola (Pat. & Har.) Drechsler-Santos & Wartchow (2012)
- Panus ciliatus (Lév.) T.W.May & A.E.Wood (1995)
- Panus conchatus (Bull.) Fr. (1838)
- Panus conglomeratus Lloyd (1922)
- Panus convivalis Corner (1981)
- Panus domicola Speg. (1909)
- Panus fasciatus (Berk) Pegler (1965)
- Panus hirtiformis (Murrill) Drechsler-Santos & Wartchow (2012)
- Panus hookerianus (Berk.) T.W.May & A.E.Wood (1995)
- Panus incandescens Berk. & Broome (1883)
- Panus indicus Sathe & J.T. Daniel (1981)
- Panus japonicus (Yasuda) Yasuda (1922)
- Panus johorensis Corner (1981)
- Panus kinabaluensis Corner (1981)
- Panus luteolus Massee (1902)
- Panus maculatus Berk. (1855)
- Panus meruliceps Peck (1906)
- Panus murinus Bres. (1915)
- Panus neostrigosus Drechsler-Santos & Wartchow (2012)
- Panus piceus Velen. (1930)
- Panus piperatus Beeli (1928)
- Panus pruni Velen. (1920)
- Panus punctaticeps (Berk. & Broome) T.W.May & A.E.Wood (1995)
- Panus purpuratus G.Stev. (1964)
- Panus pusillus Velen. (1930)
- Panus ramosus Métrod (1946)
- Panus semirudis Singer (1936)
- Panus setiger (Lév.) Teng (1963)
- Panus similis (Berk. & Broome) T.W.May & A.E.Wood (1995)
- Panus solomonensis Corner (1981)
- Panus strigellus (Berk.) Overh. (1930)
- Panus tahitensis Reichardt (1866)
- Panus tephroleucus (Mont.) T.W.May & A.E.Wood (1995)
- Panus vetustus Corner (1981)
