= Ehrenstein illusion =

Optical illusion

The original Ehrenstein illusion, where the grating pattern of dark segments produce the illusion of brighter circles and squares.

The Ehrenstein illusion is an optical illusion of brightness or color perception. The visual phenomena was studied by the German psychologist Walter H. Ehrenstein (1899–1961) who originally wanted to modify the theory behind the Hermann grid illusion. In the discovery of the optical illusion, Ehrenstein found that grating patterns of straight lines that stop at a certain point appear to have a brighter centre, compared to the background.

Ehrenstein published his book Modifications of the Brightness Phenomenon of L. Hermann to disprove Hermann's theory. He argued that these illusions were not caused by a contrast effect, but rather a brightness effect that needed to be further explored.

== The effect ==
The Ehrenstein illusion can be classified as a brightness illusion. The borders of a shape affects the observed brightness of an image surface. These effects vary from person to person and can be further enhanced by changing the background of the configuration, or the surroundings of the image surface. The observer perceives the luminance of a surface to be brighter, despite it being identical to the background.

=== Illusory contour ===
Sometimes the "Ehrenstein" is associated with an illusory contour figure where the ends of the dark segments produce the illusion of circles or squares. The apparent circular figures at the centre of the configuration are the same colour as the background, but appear brighter. The brightness effect disappears when the line segments are joint with a circular disk. This fits under the characteristics of an optical illusion, as there are no physical origins to the asymmetrical perceptual sensations we perceive.

A similar effect of illusory contour is seen in figures such as the Kanizsa triangle.

Ehrenstein illusion variations

Variation of the Ehrenstein illusion shows a paradox of shape perception. The square appears curved when placed inside concentric circles.

The illusion of a bright central disk (above) is destroyed by adding a darker circle (bottom).

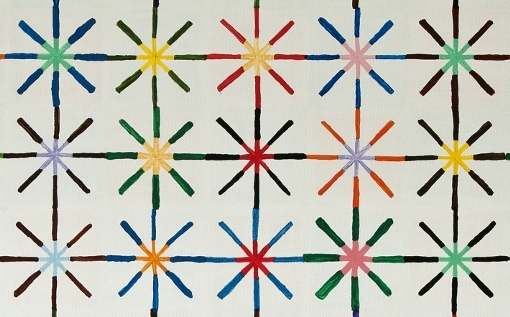
Central disk illusion with colored lines, demonstrating the "neon color spreading" effect

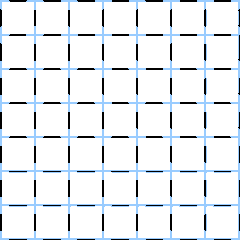
Grating pattern with colored lines

=== Variations ===
Ehrenstein carried out variations of the original illusion to test out how the strength of perception can change. In one variation, he changed the thickness of the lines. He found that the lines could be made very thin, and the illusion would still remain. The brightness of the centre increases with the thickness of the lines. However, when the lines become so broad that the central white line was enclosed, the illusion loses its bright appearance and is no longer visible.

==== Paradox of shape perception ====
In 1954, further variations of the original Ehrenstein illusion found that the sides of a square take on an apparent curved shaped when placed inside a pattern of concentric circles. This optical illusion uses geometric factors to create an illusory contour of the shape, unlike the other configurations which use illusory brightness. Ehrenstein also found when he reduced the size of the overall figure, it enhanced the paradox and made the contour appear thicker. The shapes in the image remain constant despite small changes in the overall characteristics of the configuration. The monochrome colours of the images further enhances the illusion of the square becoming curved.

== Theories and explanations ==
Gestalt psychology can be used to explain theories of illusory contours. It assumes a bottom up approach to complex thinking, meaning people take in and process available information before arriving to a final conclusion. When processing an illusion, preconceived expectations and beliefs about an image or shape is then applied to explain the unknown of an illusion. Cognitive interpretations of a physical stimulus are constructed from the expectations of what we know, rather than what we visually see. This means when viewing an optical illusion or configuration, we intrinsically construct the image as whole again using any cognitive or symbolic cues available. German psychologist Wolfgang Köhler described this behaviour as "explaining away." If sightings can not be explained immediately, the brain invents alternative interpretations which have no factual or perceptual evidence behind it as a way to fill in the gaps.

This theory stems from the concept of cognitive dissonance. When the brain holds two conflicting beliefs at the same time, it will do anything to change them so they are consistent with one another. We do this because we feel a sense of discomfort when our norms and expectations are violated. This is seen in the Ehrenstein illusions. The absence of physical stimuli, such as incomplete grids, makes the mind uncomfortable. In order to resolve this issue, the brain produces images of circles and squares to create order and consistency. Visual processing of incomplete or confusing stimuli therefore relies on intrinsic problem-solving processes to restore information.

=== Criticisms ===
Gestalt psychology and cognitive dissonance theories of illusions have been criticised for their unsatisfactory explanations of brightness effects. Although they explore how and when the illusory brightness or contour can vary, there is limited explanation on how the illusory form emerges. Therefore, current descriptions of the Ehrenstein illusion are not sufficient as they do not report the visual and perceptual mechanisms of the phenomena. According to the German neurologist Lothar Spillman, further research is required to create a new theory which accounts for both the characteristics of the illusory stimulus and the perceptual processing of the individual.

There is also conflicting evidence against the current explanations of perception. Gestalt psychology assumes that the brain must have some kind of previous expectation which forms the basis of the illusion, before a conscious interpretation of the stimulus takes place. However, recent computational studies seem to suggest that the representation of the stimuli is built up from the brain through the competition and cooperation of visual neurons. Once again, further neurophysiological and psychological research is required to assess whether the current theories are an accurate model of the Ehrenstein illusion.
