= Gaetano Kanizsa =

Italian psychologist and artist

Kanizsa triangle

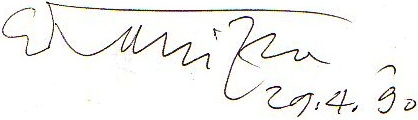
Signature of Gaetano Kanizsa

Gaetano Kanizsa (Hebrew: גאטאנו קאניזסא; 18 August 1913 – 13 March 1993) was an Italian psychologist and artist of Jewish and Slovenian descent who last served as a founder of the Institute of Psychology of Trieste.

== Biography ==
Gaetano Kanizsa was born on 18 August 1913 in Trieste, Austria-Hungary to a Jewish father from Nagybecskerek and a Slovene mother from Bovec. His surname is analogous to the Hungarian town Kanizsa (now Nagykanizsa).

He attended the classic lyceum and got the laurea (post-secondary academic degree) at the University of Padova in 1938, writing a thesis on eidetic memory. In 1947 he became a teaching assistant at the University of Florence. In 1953 he returned to Trieste with the role of full professor at the University of Trieste, chair he held for 30 years. He retired from academic life in 1988 and continued research until 1993, the year of his death.

=== Psychology ===
A dominant figure in Italian psychology, Kanizsa became famous in the 1970s, after having published an article about illusory contours in Scientific American (1976) and the book Organization in Vision (1979).

A figure in which three illusory contours form a triangle is known as a Kanizsa triangle.

To his scientific interest, Kanizsa added his painting activity.

=== Bibliography ===
- Organization in Vision: Essays on Gestalt Perception, Praeger Publishers, 1979, ISBN 0-275-90373-7
  - Grammatica del vedere. Saggi su percezione e Gestalt, Il Mulino, Bologna, 1997, ISBN 978-88-15-06090-7
- Percezione, linguaggio, pensiero (Perception, speech, thought) by Gaetano Kanizsa, Paolo Legrenzi, M. Sonino, Il Mulino, Bologna, 1983
- Vedere e pensare (Seeing and thinking), Il Mulino, Bologna, 1991
