= Ignaz Paul Vital Troxler =

Swiss psychologist (1780–1866)

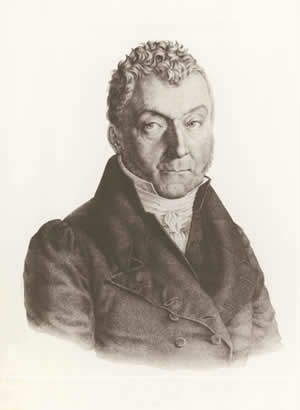
Ignaz Paul Vital Troxler (1830)

Ignaz Paul Vital Troxler (17 August 1780 – 6 March 1866) was a Swiss physician, politician, and philosopher.

== Early life, education, and career ==
Troxler was born in August 1780 in Beromünster, Switzerland. He studied in Jena and Göttingen. Among his teachers were Georg Wilhelm Friedrich Hegel and Friedrich Wilhelm Joseph von Schelling. After earning his degree, he worked as a physician in Vienna, where he befriended Ludwig van Beethoven and married Wilhelmine Polborn. During that time, Troxler discovered a phenomenon of visual perception which is remarkably often confused with color-fading color-adaptation, that now bears his name, Troxler's fading.

== Teaching and later life ==
In 1811, he returned to Beromünster. Troxler represented Switzerland at the Congress of Vienna in 1815. In 1820 he became a professor for philosophy and history at the lyceum in Lucerne but had to leave after a year due to political problems. He founded an educational institution in Aarau and continued working as a physician. In 1830, he returned to teaching, this time in Basel; but had to leave once again the next year due to political problems. In 1832 he was elected to the legislative assembly of the canton of Aargau. He became a professor at the newly established University of Berne in 1834, where he stayed until 1850.

In 1848, Troxler succeeded in altering the Swiss Federal Constitution to include elements of the United States Constitution.

== Death ==
Troxler died on 6 March 1866 in Aarau, Switzerland, and is buried there.
