= Troxler's fading =

Optical illusion affecting visual perception

In this example, the spots in the "lilac chaser" illusion fade away after several seconds when the black cross is stared at long enough. This leaves a grey background and the cross. Some viewers may notice that the moving space has faded into a moving blue-green spot, possibly with a short trail following it. Furthermore, moving one's eyes away from the image after a period of time may result in a brief, strong afterimage of a circle of green spots.

Troxler's fading, also called Troxler fading or the Troxler effect, is an optical illusion affecting visual perception. When one fixates on a particular point for even a short period of time, an unchanging stimulus away from the fixation point will fade away and disappear. Research suggests that at least some portion of the perceptual phenomena associated with Troxler's fading occurs in the brain.

== Discovery ==
Troxler's fading was first identified by Swiss physician Ignaz Paul Vital Troxler in 1804, who was practicing in Vienna at the time.

== Process ==
=== Neural adaptation ===
Troxler's fading has been attributed to the adaptation of neurons vital for perceiving stimuli in the visual system. It is part of the general principle in sensory systems that unvarying stimuli soon disappear from our awareness. For example, if a small piece of paper is dropped on the inside of one's forearm, it is felt for a short period of time. Soon, however, the sensation fades away. This is because the tactile neurons have adapted and start to ignore the unimportant stimulus. But if one jiggles one's arm up and down, giving varying stimulation, one will continue to feel the paper.

=== Visual parallels ===
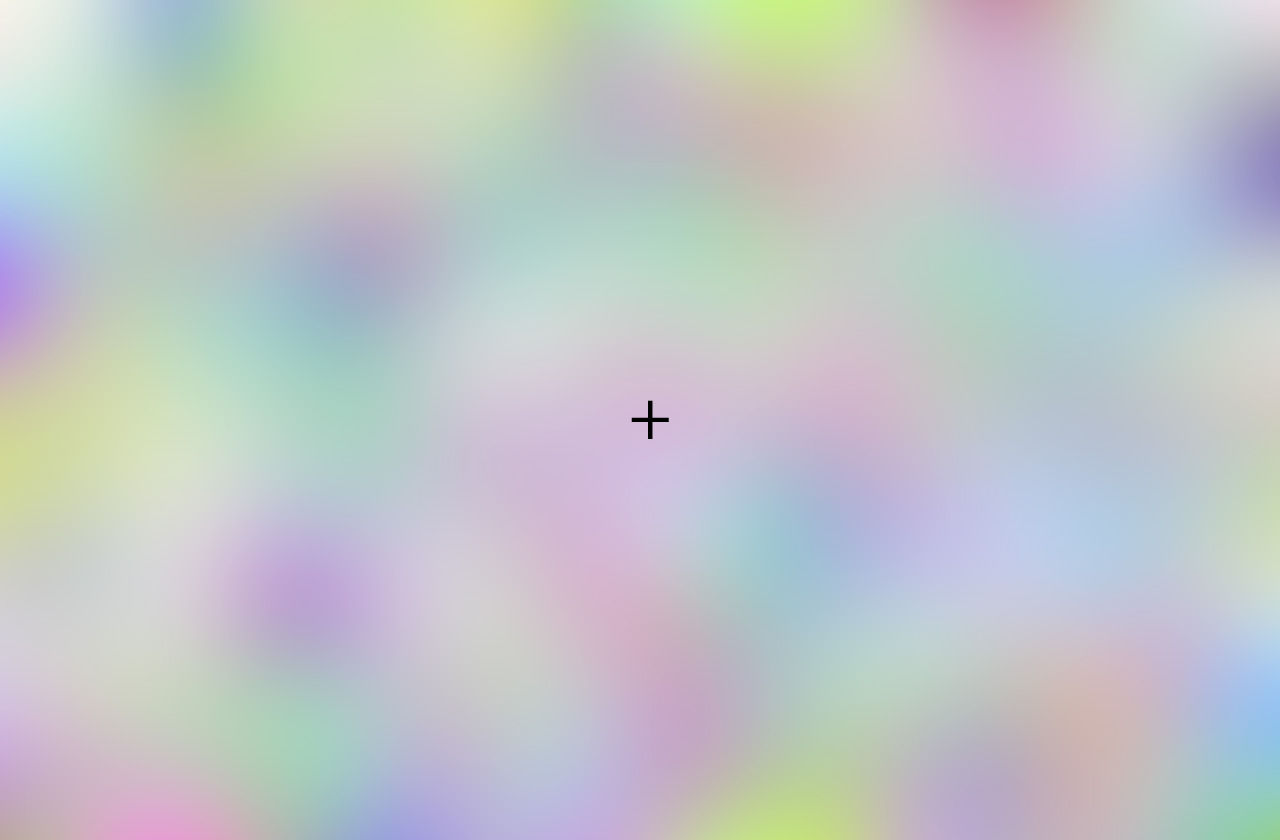
The neural adaptation effect of Troxler's fading can be experienced by looking at the cross from a short distance without moving the eyes. After a few seconds, the colors seem to vanish. [Click on image to enlarge]

A similar "sensory fading", or filling-in, can be seen of a fixated stimulus when its retinal image is made stationary on the retina (a stabilized retinal image). Stabilization can be done in at least three ways.

- First, one can mount a tiny projector on a contact lens. The projector shines an image into the eye. As the eye moves, the contact lens moves with it, so the image is always projected onto the same part of the retina;
- Second, one can monitor eye movements and move the stimulus to cancel the eye movements;
- Third, one can induce an afterimage, usually by an intense, brief flash, such as when one is photographed using a photographic flash (a form of stabilized retinal image that most people have experienced). This causes an image to be bleached onto the retina by the strong response of the rods and cones. In all these cases, the stimulus fades away after a short time and disappears.

The Troxler effect is enhanced if the stimulus is small, is of low contrast (or "equiluminant"), or is blurred. The effect is enhanced the further the stimulus is away from the fixation point.

== Explanation of effect ==
Troxler's fading can occur without any extraordinary stabilization of the retinal image in peripheral vision because the neurons in the visual system beyond the rods and cones have large receptive fields. This means that the small, involuntary eye movements made when fixating on something fail to move the stimulus onto a new cell's receptive field, in effect giving unvarying stimulation. Hsieh and Tse showed in 2006 that at least some portion of the perceptual fading occurred in the brain, not in the eyes.

== See also ==
- Cognitive science
- Lilac chaser – An illusion that involves Troxler fading
- Bloody Mary - one of the most well known examples of this effect
