= Lilac chaser =

Optical illusion

Stare at the center cross for at least 30 seconds to experience the phi phenomena of the illusion

The lilac chaser is a visual illusion, also known as the Pac-Man illusion. It consists of 12 lilac (or pink, rose, or magenta) blurred discs arranged in a circle (like the numbers on a clock) around a small black central cross on a grey background. One of the discs disappears briefly (for about 0.1 seconds), then the next (about 0.125 seconds later), and the next, and so on, in a clockwise direction. When one stares at the cross for at least 30 seconds, one sees three illusions:

1. A gap running around the circle of lilac discs;
2. A green disc running around the circle of lilac discs in place of the gap; and
3. The green disc running around on the grey background, with the lilac discs having disappeared in sequence.

The illusion was created by Jeremy Hinton some time before 2005. It then spread widely over the Internet. It is a visual illusion that demonstrates color adaptation or human visual perception.

The chaser effect results from the phi phenomenon illusion, combined with an afterimage effect in which an opposite color, or complementary color – green – appears when each lilac spot disappears (if the discs were blue, one would see yellow), and Troxler's fading of the lilac discs.

If viewed from far away, the space between the ring and target may seem a dull lilac.

== History ==
The illusion was created by Jeremy Hinton sometime before 2005. He stumbled across the configuration while devising stimuli for visual motion experiments. In one version of a program to move a disc around a central point, he mistakenly neglected to erase the preceding disc, which created the appearance of a moving gap. On noticing the moving green-disc afterimage, he adjusted foreground and background colors, number of discs, and timing to optimize the effect.

In 2005 Hinton blurred the discs, allowing them to disappear when a viewer looks steadily at the central cross. Hinton entered the illusion in the European Conference on Visual Perception's Visual Illusion Contest, but was disqualified for not being registered for that year's conference. Hinton approached Michael Bach, who placed an animated GIF of the illusion on his web page of illusions. Bach named it the "Lilac Chaser", and later presented a configurable Java version. The illusion became popular on the Internet in 2005.

== Explanation ==
The lilac chaser illusion combines three simple, well-known effects, as described, for example, by Bertamini.

1. The phi phenomenon is the optical illusion of perceiving continuous motion between separate objects viewed rapidly in succession. The phenomenon was defined by Max Wertheimer in the Gestalt psychology in 1912 and along with persistence of vision formed a part of the base of the theory of cinema, applied by Hugo Münsterberg in 1916. The visual events in the lilac chaser initially are the disappearances of the lilac discs. The visual events then become the appearances of green afterimages (see next).
2. When a lilac stimulus that is presented to a particular region of the visual field for a long time (say 10 seconds or so) disappears, a green afterimage will appear. The afterimage lasts only a short time, and in this case is effaced by the reappearance of the lilac stimulus. The afterimage is a consequence of neural adaptation of the cells that carry signals from the retina of the eye to the rest of the brain, the retinal ganglion cells. According to opponent process theory, the human visual system interprets color information by processing signals from the retinal ganglion cells in three opponent channels: red versus green, blue versus yellow, and black versus white. Responses to one color of an opponent channel are antagonistic to those of the other color. Therefore, a lilac image (a combination of red and blue) will produce a green afterimage from adaptation of the red and the blue channels, so they produce weaker signals. Anything resulting in less lilac is interpreted as a combination of the other primary colors, which are green and yellow.
3. When a blurry stimulus is presented to a region of the visual field, and we keep our eyes still, that stimulus will disappear even though it is still physically presented. This is called Troxler fading.

These effects combine to yield the sight of a green spot running around in a circle on a grey background when only stationary, flashing lilac spots have been presented.

== Psychophysics ==
Psychophysical research has used the lilac chaser's properties. Hinton optimized the conditions for all three aspects of the illusion before releasing it. He also noted that the color of the green disc could be outside the color gamut of the monitor on which it was created (because the monitor never displays the green disc, only lilac ones). Michael Bach's version of the illusion allows viewers to adjust some aspects of the illusion. It is simple to confirm that the illusion occurs with other colors.

== See also ==
- Checker shadow illusion
