= Amodal perception =

Perception of a whole when only parts can be sensed

Amodal perception is the perception of the whole of a physical structure when only parts of it affect the sensory receptors. For example, a table will be perceived as a complete volumetric structure even if only part of it—the facing surface—projects to the retina; it is perceived as possessing internal volume and hidden rear surfaces despite the fact that only the near surfaces are exposed to view. Similarly, the world around us is perceived as a surrounding plenum, even though only part of it is in view at any time. Another much quoted example is that of the "dog behind a picket fence" in which a long narrow object (the dog) is partially occluded by fence-posts in front of it, but is nevertheless perceived as a single continuous object. Albert Bregman noted an auditory analogue of this phenomenon: when a melody is interrupted by bursts of white noise, it is nonetheless heard as a single melody continuing "behind" the bursts of noise.

Formulation of the theory is credited to the Belgian psychologist Albert Michotte and Fabio Metelli, an Italian psychologist, with their work developed in recent years by E.S. Reed and the Gestaltists.

Modal completion is a similar phenomenon in which a shape is perceived to be occluding other shapes even when the shape itself is not drawn. Examples include the triangle that appears to be occluding three disks and an outlined triangle in the Kanizsa triangle and the circles and squares that appear in different versions of the Koffka cross.

== See also ==
- Developmental psychology
- Illusory contours
- Intermodal perception
- Psychology
