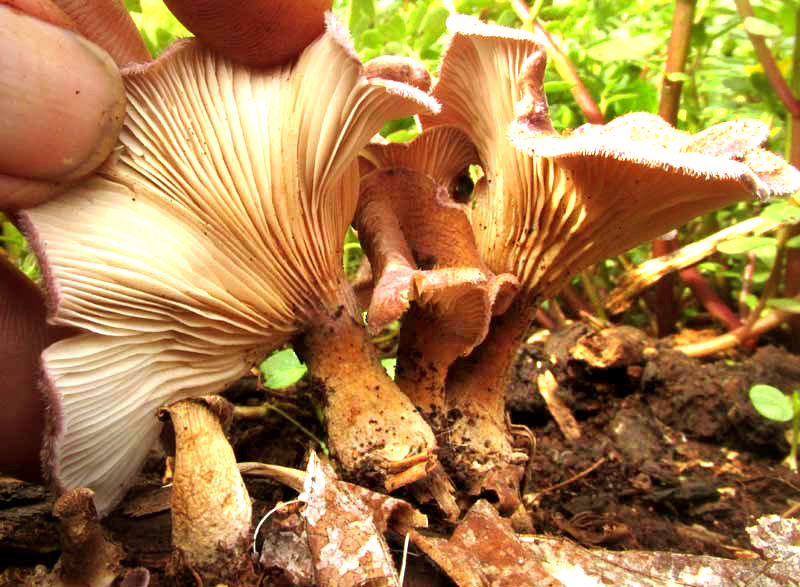
- Panus neostrigosus, a member of the Panaceae

Scientific classification
- Kingdom: Fungi
- Division: Basidiomycota
- Class: Agaricomycetes
- Order: Polyporales
- Family: Panaceae; Miettinen, Justo & Hibbett (2017)

= Panaceae =

Family of fungi

The Panaceae is a family of mushrooms belonging to the order Polyporales.

== Genera ==
As of June, 2026, the Catalogue of Life accepts 3 genera and 63 species in the family.

- Cladoderris
- Cymatoderma Jungh.
- Panus Fr.
